The Fabales are an order of flowering plants included in the rosid group of the eudicots in the Angiosperm Phylogeny Group II classification system. In the APG II circumscription, this order includes the families Fabaceae or legumes (including the subfamilies Caesalpinioideae, Mimosoideae, and Faboideae), Quillajaceae, Polygalaceae or milkworts (including the families Diclidantheraceae, Moutabeaceae, and Xanthophyllaceae), and Surianaceae. The Fabaceae, as the third-largest plant family in the world, contain most of the diversity of the Fabales, the other families making up a comparatively small portion of the order's diversity. Research in the order is largely focused on the Fabaceae, due in part to its great biological diversity, and to its importance as food plants. The Polygalaceae are fairly well researched among plant families, in part due to the large diversity of the genus Polygala, and other members of the family being food plants for various Lepidoptera (butterfly and moth) species.

The anthophytes are a grouping of plant taxa bearing flower-like reproductive structures. They were formerly thought to be a clade comprising plants bearing flower-like structures.  The group contained the angiosperms - the extant flowering plants, such as roses and grasses - as well as the Gnetales and the extinct Bennettitales.

23,420 species of vascular plant have been recorded in South Africa, making it the sixth most species-rich country in the world and the most species-rich country on the African continent. Of these, 153 species are considered to be threatened. Nine biomes have been described in South Africa: Fynbos, Succulent Karoo, desert, Nama Karoo, grassland, savanna, Albany thickets, the Indian Ocean coastal belt, and forests.

The 2018 South African National Biodiversity Institute's National Biodiversity Assessment plant checklist lists 35,130 taxa in the phyla Anthocerotophyta (hornworts (6)), Anthophyta (flowering plants (33534)), Bryophyta (mosses (685)), Cycadophyta (cycads (42)), Lycopodiophyta (Lycophytes(45)), Marchantiophyta (liverworts (376)), Pinophyta (conifers (33)), and Pteridophyta (cryptogams (408)).

Two families are represented in the literature. Listed taxa include species, subspecies, varieties, and forms as recorded, some of which have subsequently been allocated to other taxa as synonyms, in which cases the accepted taxon is appended to the listing. Multiple entries under alternative names reflect taxonomic revision over time.

Fabaceae
Family: Fabaceae,

Abrus
Genus Abrus:
 Abrus laevigatus E.Mey. indigenous
 Abrus precatorius L. indigenous
 Abrus precatorius L. subsp. africanus Verdc. indigenous

Acacia
Genus Acacia:
 Acacia adunca A.Cunn. ex G.Don, not indigenous, naturalised
 Acacia arenaria Schinz, accepted as Vachellia arenaria (Schinz) Kyal. & Boatwr.
 Acacia armata R.Br. accepted as Acacia paradoxa DC. not indigenous, naturalised
 Acacia ataxacantha DC. accepted as Senegalia ataxacantha (DC.) Kyal. & Boatwr. indigenous
 Acacia baileyana F.Muell. not indigenous, naturalised, invasive
 Acacia borleae Burtt Davy, accepted as Vachellia borleae (Burtt Davy) Kyal. & Boatwr. indigenous
 Acacia brevispica Harms, accepted as Senegalia brevispica (Harms) Seigler & Ebinger, indigenous
 Acacia brevispica Harms subsp. dregeana (Benth.) Brenan, accepted as Senegalia brevispica (Harms) Seigler & Ebinger subsp. dregeana (Benth.) Kyal. & Boatwr. indigenous
 Acacia burkei Benth. accepted as Senegalia burkei (Benth.) Kyal. & Boatwr. indigenous
 Acacia caffra (Thunb.) Willd. accepted as Senegalia caffra (Thunb.) P.J.H.Hurter & Mabb. indigenous
 Acacia crassiuscula H.L.Wendl. not indigenous, naturalised
 Acacia cultriformis A.Cunn. ex G.Don, not indigenous, naturalised
 Acacia cyclops A.Cunn. ex G.Don, not indigenous, naturalised, invasive
 Acacia davyi N.E.Br. accepted as Vachellia davyi (N.E.Br.) Kyal. & Boatwr. indigenous
 Acacia dealbata Link, not indigenous, naturalised, invasive
 Acacia decurrens Willd. not indigenous, naturalised, invasive
 Acacia dyeri P.P.Sw. accepted as Vachellia dyeri (P.P.Sw.) Kyal. & Boatwr. endemic
 Acacia ebutsiniorum P.J.H.Hurter, accepted as Vachellia ebutsiniorum (P.J.H.Hurter) Kyal. & Boatwr. present
 Acacia elata A.Cunn. ex Benth. not indigenous, naturalised, invasive
 Acacia erioloba E.Mey. accepted as Vachellia erioloba (E.Mey.) P.J.H.Hurter, indigenous
 Acacia erubescens Welw. ex Oliv. accepted as Senegalia erubescens (Welw. ex Oliv.) Kyal. & Boatwr. indigenous
 Acacia exuvialis I.Verd. accepted as Vachellia exuvialis (I.Verd.) Kyal. & Boatwr. indigenous
 Acacia farnesiana (L.) Willd. accepted as Vachellia farnesiana (L.) Wight & Arn. not indigenous, naturalised
 Acacia ferox Benth. accepted as Senegalia burkei (Benth.) Kyal. & Boatwr. indigenous
 Acacia fimbriata A.Cunn. ex G.Don, not indigenous, naturalised, invasive
 Acacia fleckii Schinz, indigenous
 Acacia galpinii Burtt Davy, accepted as Senegalia galpinii (Burtt Davy) Seigler & Ebinger, indigenous
 Acacia gerrardii Benth. accepted as Vachellia gerrardii (Benth.) P.J.H.Hurter, indigenous
 Acacia goetzei Harms subsp. microphylla Brenan, accepted as Senegalia goetzei (Harms) Kyal. & Boatwr. subsp. microphylla (Brenan) Kyal. & Boatwr.
 Acacia grandicornuta Gerstner, accepted as Vachellia grandicornuta (Gerstner) Seigler & Ebinger, indigenous
 Acacia haematoxylon Willd. accepted as Vachellia haematoxylon (Willd.) Seigler & Ebinger, indigenous
 Acacia hebeclada DC. subsp. chobiensis (O.B.Mill.) A.Schreib. accepted as Vachellia hebeclada (DC.) Kyal. & Boatwr. subsp. chobiensis (O.B.Mill.) Kyal. & Boatwr.
 Acacia hebeclada DC. subsp. tristis (Welw. ex Oliv.) A.Schreib. accepted as Vachellia hebeclada (DC.) Kyal. & Boatwr. subsp. tristis (A.Schreib.) Kyal. & Boatwr.
 Acacia hereroensis Engl. accepted as Senegalia hereroensis (Engl.) Kyal. & Boatwr. indigenous
 Acacia implexa Benth. not indigenous, naturalised, invasive
 Acacia karroo Hayne, accepted as Vachellia karroo (Hayne) Banfi & Gallaso, indigenous
 Acacia kosiensis P.P.Sw. accepted as Vachellia kosiensis (P.P.Sw. & Coates Palgr.) Kyal. & Boatwr. present
 Acacia kraussiana Meisn. ex Benth. accepted as Senegalia kraussiana (Meisn. ex Benth.) Kyal. & Boatwr. indigenous
 Acacia longifolia (Andrews) Willd. not indigenous, naturalised, invasive
 Acacia luederitzii Engl. accepted as Vachellia luederitzii (Engl.) Kyal. & Boatwr. indigenous
 Acacia luederitzii Engl. var. retinens (Sim) J.H.Ross & Brenan, accepted as Vachellia luederitzii (Engl.) Kyal. & Boatwr. var. retinens (Sim) & Kyal. & Boatwr. indigenous
 Acacia mearnsii De Wild. not indigenous, naturalised, invasive
 Acacia melanoxylon R.Br. not indigenous, naturalised, invasive
 Acacia mellifera (Vahl) Benth. subsp. detinens (Burch.) Brenan, accepted as Senegalia mellifera (Vahl) Seigler & Ebinger subsp. detinens (Burch.) Kyal. & Boatwr. indigenous
 Acacia montana P.P.Sw. accepted as Acacia theronii P.P.Sw. present
 Acacia montis-usti  Merxm. & A.Schreib. accepted as Senegalia montis-usti (Merxm. & A.Schreib.) Kyal. & Boatwr.
 Acacia natalitia E.Mey. accepted as Vachellia natalitia (E.Mey.) Kyal. & Boatwr. endemic
 Acacia nebrownii Burtt Davy, accepted as Vachellia nebrownii (Burtt Davy) Seigler & Ebinger, indigenous
 Acacia nigrescens Oliv. accepted as Senegalia nigrescens (Oliv.) P.J.H.Hurter, indigenous
 Acacia nilotica (L.) Willd. ex Delile subsp. kraussiana (Benth.) Brenan, accepted as Vachellia nilotica (L.) P.J.H.Hurter & Mabb. subsp. kraussiana (Benth.) Kyal. & Boatwr. indigenous
 Acacia ormocarpoides P.J.H.Hurter, accepted as Vachellia ormocarpoides (P.J.H.Hurter) Kyal. & Boatwr. present
 Acacia paradoxa DC. not indigenous, naturalised, invasive
 Acacia permixta Burtt Davy, accepted as Vachellia permixta (Burtt Davy) Kyal. & Boatwr. indigenous
 Acacia podalyriifolia A.Cunn. ex G.Don, not indigenous, naturalised, invasive
 Acacia polyacantha Willd. subsp. campylacantha (Hochst. ex A.Rich.) Brenan, accepted as Senegalia polyacantha (Willd.) Seigler & Ebinger subsp. campylacantha (Hochst. ex A.Rich.) Kyal. & B, indigenous
 Acacia pycnantha Benth. not indigenous, naturalised, invasive
 Acacia rehmanniana Schinz, accepted as Vachellia rehmanniana (Schinz) Kyal. & Boatwr. indigenous
 Acacia retinodes Schltdl. not indigenous, cultivated, naturalised
 Acacia robbertsii P.P.Sw. accepted as Vachellia robbertsei (P.P.Sw.) Kyal. & Boatwr. present
 Acacia robusta Burch. subsp. clavigera (E.Mey.) Brenan, accepted as Vachellia robusta (Burch.) Kyal. & Boatwr. subsp. clavigera (E.Mey.) & Kyal. & Boatwr. indigenous
 Acacia saligna (Labill.) H.L.Wendl. not indigenous, naturalised, invasive
 Acacia schlechteri Harms, accepted as Senegalia burkei (Benth.) Kyal. & Boatwr.
 Acacia sekhukhuniensis P.J.H.Hurter, accepted as Vachellia sekhukhuniensis (P.J.H.Hurter) Kyal. & Boatwr. endemic
 Acacia senegal (L.) Willd. var. leiorhachis Brenan, accepted as Senegalia senegal (L.) Britton var. leiorhachis (Brenan) Kyal. & Boatwr. indigenous
 Acacia senegal (L.) Willd. var. rostrata Brenan, accepted as Senegalia senegal (L.) Britton var. rostrata (Brenan) Kyal. & Boatwr. indigenous
 Acacia sieberiana DC. var. woodii (Burtt Davy) Keay & Brenan, accepted as Vachellia sieberiana (DC.) Kyal. & Boatwr. var. woodii (Burtt Davy) Kyal. & Boatwr. indigenous
 Acacia stricta (Andrews) Willd. not indigenous, naturalised, invasive
 Acacia stuhlmannii Taub. accepted as Vachellia stuhlmannii (Taub.) Kyal. & Boatwr. indigenous
 Acacia swazica Burtt Davy, accepted as Vachellia swazica (Burtt Davy) Kyal. & Boatwr. indigenous
 Acacia tenuispina I.Verd. accepted as Vachellia tenuispina (I.Verd.) Kyal. & Boatwr. indigenous
 Acacia theronii P.P.Sw. endemic
 Acacia tortilis (Forssk.) Hayne subsp. heteracantha (Burch.) Brenan, accepted as Vachellia tortilis (Forssk.) Gallaso & Banfi subsp. heteracantha (Burch.) Kyal. & Boatwr. present
 Acacia tortilis (Forssk.) Hayne subsp. spirocarpa (Hochst. ex A.Rich.) Brenan var. spirocarpa,   accepted as Vachellia tortilis (Forssk.) Gallaso & Banfi subsp. spirocarpa (Hochst. ex A.Rich.) Kyal. & Boatwr.
 Acacia viscidula A.Cunn. ex Benth. not indigenous, cultivated, naturalised, invasive
 Acacia welwitschii Oliv. subsp. delagoensis (Harms) J.H.Ross & Brenan, accepted as Senegalia welwitschii (Oliv.) Kyal. & Boatwr. subsp. delagoensis (Harms ex Burtt Davy) Kyal. & Boatw, indigenous
 Acacia xanthophloea Benth. accepted as Vachellia xanthophloea (Benth.) P.J.H.Hurter, indigenous

Acrocarpus
Genus Acrocarpus:
 Acrocarpus fraxinifolius Arn. not indigenous, cultivated, naturalised

Adenolobus
Genus Adenolobus:
 Adenolobus garipensis (E.Mey.) Torre & Hillc. indigenous

Adenopodia
Genus Adenopodia:
 Adenopodia spicata (E.Mey.) C.Presl, indigenous

Aeschynomene
Genus Aeschynomene:
 Aeschynomene indica L. indigenous
 Aeschynomene micrantha DC. indigenous
 Aeschynomene nodulosa (Baker) Baker f. indigenous
 Aeschynomene nodulosa (Baker) Baker f. var. glabrescens J.B.Gillett, indigenous
 Aeschynomene nodulosa (Baker) Baker f. var. nodulosa, indigenous
 Aeschynomene nyassana Taub. indigenous
 Aeschynomene rehmannii Schinz, indigenous
 Aeschynomene rehmannii Schinz var. leptobotrya (Harms ex Baker f.) J.B.Gillett, indigenous
 Aeschynomene rehmannii Schinz var. rehmannii, indigenous
 Aeschynomene rhodesiaca Harms, indigenous
 Aeschynomene uniflora E.Mey. indigenous
 Aeschynomene uniflora E.Mey. var. uniflora,   indigenous

Afzelia
Genus Afzelia:
 Afzelia quanzensis Welw. indigenous

Albizia
Genus Albizia:
 Albizia adianthifolia (Schumach.) W.Wight, indigenous
 Albizia adianthifolia (Schumach.) W.Wight var. adianthifolia,   indigenous
 Albizia amara (Roxb.) Boivin subsp. sericocephala (Benth.) Brenan, indigenous
 Albizia anthelmintica (A.Rich.) Brongn. indigenous
 Albizia antunesiana Harms, indigenous
 Albizia brevifolia Schinz, indigenous
 Albizia forbesii Benth. indigenous
 Albizia harveyi E.Fourn. indigenous
 Albizia julibrissin (Willd.) Durazz. not indigenous, naturalised
 Albizia lebbeck (L.) Benth. not indigenous, naturalised, invasive
 Albizia petersiana (Bolle) Oliv. indigenous
 Albizia petersiana (Bolle) Oliv. subsp. evansii (Burtt Davy) Brenan, indigenous
 Albizia procera (Roxb.) Benth. not indigenous, naturalised, invasive
 Albizia suluensis Gerstner, endemic
 Albizia tanganyicensis Baker f. indigenous
 Albizia tanganyicensis Baker f. subsp. tanganyicensis,   indigenous
 Albizia versicolor Welw. ex Oliv. indigenous

Alhagi
Genus Alhagi:
 Alhagi maurorum Medik. not indigenous, naturalised, invasive

Alistilus
Genus Alistilus:
 Alistilus bechuanicus N.E.Br. indigenous

Alysicarpus
Genus Alysicarpus:
 Alysicarpus glumaceus (Vahl) DC. subsp. glumaceus var. glumaceus,   indigenous
 Alysicarpus rugosus (Willd.) DC. indigenous
 Alysicarpus rugosus (Willd.) DC. subsp. perennirufus J.Leonard, indigenous
 Alysicarpus rugosus (Willd.) DC. subsp. rugosus,   indigenous
 Alysicarpus vaginalis (L.) DC. indigenous
 Alysicarpus vaginalis (L.) DC. var. vaginalis,   indigenous
 Alysicarpus zeyheri Harv. indigenous

Amphinomia
Genus Amphinomia:
 Amphinomia furcata Merxm. & A.Schreib. accepted as Leobordea furcata (Merxm. & A.Schreib.) L.A.Silva & J.Freitas, indigenous

Amphithalea
Genus Amphithalea:
 Amphithalea alba Granby, endemic
 Amphithalea axillaris Granby, endemic
 Amphithalea biovulata (Bolus) Granby, endemic
 Amphithalea bodkinii Dummer, endemic
 Amphithalea bowiei (Benth.) A.L.Schutte, endemic
 Amphithalea bullata (Benth.) A.L.Schutte, endemic
 Amphithalea cedarbergensis (Granby) A.L.Schutte, endemic
 Amphithalea ciliaris Eckl. & Zeyh. endemic
 Amphithalea concava Granby, endemic
 Amphithalea cuneifolia Eckl. & Zeyh. endemic
 Amphithalea cymbifolia (C.A.Sm.) A.L.Schutte, endemic
 Amphithalea dahlgrenii (Granby) A.L.Schutte, endemic
 Amphithalea ericifolia (L.) Eckl. & Zeyh. indigenous
 Amphithalea ericifolia (L.) Eckl. & Zeyh. subsp. erecta Granby, endemic
 Amphithalea ericifolia (L.) Eckl. & Zeyh. subsp. ericifolia,   endemic
 Amphithalea ericifolia (L.) Eckl. & Zeyh. subsp. minuta Granby, endemic
 Amphithalea ericifolia (L.) Eckl. & Zeyh. subsp. scoparia Granby, endemic
 Amphithalea esterhuyseniae (Granby) A.L.Schutte, endemic
 Amphithalea flava (Granby) A.L.Schutte, endemic
 Amphithalea fourcadei Compton, endemic
 Amphithalea imbricata (L.) Druce, endemic
 Amphithalea intermedia Eckl. & Zeyh. endemic
 Amphithalea micrantha Walp. endemic
 Amphithalea minima (Granby) A.L.Schutte, endemic
 Amphithalea monticola A.L.Schutte, endemic
 Amphithalea muirii (Granby) A.L.Schutte, endemic
 Amphithalea muraltioides (Benth.) A.L.Schutte, endemic
 Amphithalea obtusiloba (Granby) A.L.Schutte, endemic
 Amphithalea oppositifolia L.Bolus, endemic
 Amphithalea ornata Boatwr. & J.C.Manning, endemic
 Amphithalea pageae (L.Bolus) A.L.Schutte, endemic
 Amphithalea parvifolia (Thunb.) A.L.Schutte, endemic
 Amphithalea perplexa Eckl. & Zeyh. endemic
 Amphithalea phylicoides Eckl. & Zeyh. endemic
 Amphithalea purpurea (Granby) A.L.Schutte, endemic
 Amphithalea rostrata A.L.Schutte & B.-E.van Wyk, endemic
 Amphithalea sericea Schltr. endemic
 Amphithalea speciosa Schltr. endemic
 Amphithalea spinosa (Harv.) A.L.Schutte, endemic
 Amphithalea stokoei L.Bolus, endemic
 Amphithalea tomentosa (Thunb.) Granby, endemic
 Amphithalea tortilis (E.Mey.) Steud. endemic
 Amphithalea villosa Schltr. endemic
 Amphithalea villosa Schltr. var. brevifolia Schltr. accepted as Amphithalea muraltioides (Benth.) A.L.Schutte, present
 Amphithalea violacea (E.Mey.) Benth. endemic
 Amphithalea virgata Eckl. & Zeyh. endemic
 Amphithalea vlokii (A.L.Schutte & B.-E.van Wyk) A.L.Schutte, endemic
 Amphithalea williamsonii Harv. endemic

Arachis
Genus Arachis:
 Arachis hypogaea L. not indigenous, naturalised

Argyrolobium
Genus Argyrolobium:
 Argyrolobium aciculare Dummer, endemic
 Argyrolobium adscendens (E.Mey.) Walp. ex Harms, indigenous
 Argyrolobium amplexicaule (E.Mey.) Dummer, endemic
 Argyrolobium andrewsianum (E.Mey.) Steud. var. helvolum Harv. accepted as Argyrolobium tomentosum (Andrews) Druce, present
 Argyrolobium angustifolium Eckl. & Zeyh. accepted as Argyrolobium tuberosum Eckl. & Zeyh. present
 Argyrolobium angustissimum (E.Mey.) T.J.Edwards, endemic
 Argyrolobium argenteum Eckl. & Zeyh. endemic
 Argyrolobium ascendens (E.Mey.) Walp. ex Harms, indigenous
 Argyrolobium baptisioides (E.Mey.) Walp. endemic
 Argyrolobium barbatum Walp. endemic
 Argyrolobium biflorum Eckl. & Zeyh. accepted as Argyrolobium pauciflorum Eckl. & Zeyh. present
 Argyrolobium campicola Harms, endemic
 Argyrolobium candicans Eckl. & Zeyh. indigenous
 Argyrolobium collinum Eckl. & Zeyh. indigenous
 Argyrolobium collinum Eckl. & Zeyh. var. angustatum Harv. accepted as Argyrolobium argenteum Eckl. & Zeyh. present
 Argyrolobium collinum Eckl. & Zeyh. var. seminudum Harv. accepted as Argyrolobium argenteum Eckl. & Zeyh. present
 Argyrolobium crassifolium Eckl. & Zeyh. endemic
 Argyrolobium crinitum (E.Mey.) Walp. endemic
 Argyrolobium filiforme (Thunb.) Eckl. & Zeyh. endemic
 Argyrolobium frutescens Burtt Davy, indigenous
 Argyrolobium glaucum Schinz, accepted as Argyrolobium tuberosum Eckl. & Zeyh. present
 Argyrolobium harmsianum Schltr. ex Harms, endemic
 Argyrolobium harveyanum Oliv. indigenous
 Argyrolobium hirsuticaule Harms, accepted as Argyrolobium lotoides Harv. present
 Argyrolobium humile E.Phillips, endemic
 Argyrolobium incanum Eckl. & Zeyh. endemic
 Argyrolobium lanceolatum (E.Mey.) Eckl. & Zeyh. accepted as Argyrolobium lunare (L.) Druce subsp. sericeum (Thunb.) T.J.Edwards, endemic
 Argyrolobium lancifolium Burtt Davy, accepted as Argyrolobium transvaalense Schinz, endemic
 Argyrolobium longifolium (Meisn.) Walp. endemic
 Argyrolobium lotoides Harv. indigenous
 Argyrolobium lunare (L.) Druce, endemic
 Argyrolobium lunare (L.) Druce subsp. lunare,   endemic
 Argyrolobium lunare (L.) Druce subsp. sericeum (Thunb.) T.J.Edwards, endemic
 Argyrolobium lydenburgense Harms, accepted as Argyrolobium tuberosum Eckl. & Zeyh. endemic
 Argyrolobium marginatum Bolus, indigenous
 Argyrolobium megarrhizum Bolus, endemic
 Argyrolobium molle Eckl. & Zeyh. endemic
 Argyrolobium muddii Dummer, endemic
 Argyrolobium muirii L.Bolus, accepted as Argyrolobium filiforme (Thunb.) Eckl. & Zeyh. endemic
 Argyrolobium nanum Burtt Davy, accepted as Argyrolobium molle Eckl. & Zeyh. present
 Argyrolobium nanum Schltr. ex Harms, endemic
 Argyrolobium nanum Walp., accepted as Argyrolobium nigrescens Dummer, present
 Argyrolobium natalense Dummer, accepted as Argyrolobium longifolium (Meisn.) Walp. present
 Argyrolobium nigrescens Dummer, indigenous
 Argyrolobium parviflorum T.J.Edwards, endemic
 Argyrolobium patens Eckl. & Zeyh. accepted as Argyrolobium molle Eckl. & Zeyh. endemic
 Argyrolobium pauciflorum Eckl. & Zeyh. indigenous
 Argyrolobium pauciflorum Eckl. & Zeyh. var. semiglabrum Harv. accepted as Argyrolobium pauciflorum Eckl. & Zeyh. endemic
 Argyrolobium petiolare (E.Mey.) Steud., endemic
 Argyrolobium pilosum Harv. accepted as Argyrolobium amplexicaule (E.Mey.) Dummer, present
 Argyrolobium podalyrioides Dummer, accepted as Argyrolobium collinum Eckl. & Zeyh. present
 Argyrolobium polyphyllum Eckl. & Zeyh. endemic
 Argyrolobium pseudotuberosum T.J.Edwards, indigenous
 Argyrolobium pumilum Eckl. & Zeyh. endemic
 Argyrolobium rarum Dummer, endemic
 Argyrolobium robustum T.J.Edwards, endemic
 Argyrolobium rogersii N.E.Br. accepted as Argyrolobium rupestre (E.Mey.) Walp. subsp. rupestre,   present
 Argyrolobium rotundifolium T.J.Edwards, indigenous
 Argyrolobium rupestre (E.Mey.) Walp. indigenous
 Argyrolobium rupestre (E.Mey.) Walp. subsp. rupestre,   indigenous
 Argyrolobium sandersonii Harv. accepted as Argyrolobium baptisioides (E.Mey.) Walp. indigenous
 Argyrolobium sankeyi Harms, endemic
 Argyrolobium sericeum (E.Mey.) Eckl. & Zeyh. accepted as Argyrolobium trifoliatum (Thunb.) Druce, endemic
 Argyrolobium sericosemium Harms, endemic
 Argyrolobium speciosum Eckl. & Zeyh. indigenous
 Argyrolobium speciosum Eckl. & Zeyh. var. glaberrimum Harv. accepted as Argyrolobium baptisioides (E.Mey.) Walp. present
 Argyrolobium splendens (E.Mey.) Walp. endemic
 Argyrolobium stenorrhizon Oliv. accepted as Argyrolobium filiforme (Thunb.) Eckl. & Zeyh. present
 Argyrolobium stipulaceum Eckl. & Zeyh. indigenous
 Argyrolobium summomontanum Hilliard & B.L.Burtt, accepted as Argyrolobium candicans Eckl. & Zeyh. present
 Argyrolobium sutherlandii Harv. accepted as Argyrolobium baptisioides (E.Mey.) Walp. endemic
 Argyrolobium thodei Harms, accepted as Argyrolobium lotoides Harv. present
 Argyrolobium tomentosum (Andrews) Druce, indigenous
 Argyrolobium transvaalense Schinz, indigenous
 Argyrolobium trifoliatum (Thunb.) Druce, endemic
 Argyrolobium tuberosum Eckl. & Zeyh. indigenous
 Argyrolobium tysonii Harms, accepted as Argyrolobium rupestre (E.Mey.) Walp. subsp. rupestre,   endemic
 Argyrolobium variopile N.E.Br. accepted as Argyrolobium lotoides Harv. present
 Argyrolobium velutinum Eckl. & Zeyh. endemic
 Argyrolobium venustum Eckl. & Zeyh. accepted as Argyrolobium pumilum Eckl. & Zeyh. present
 Argyrolobium wilmsii Harms, indigenous
 Argyrolobium woodii Dummer, accepted as Argyrolobium tuberosum Eckl. & Zeyh. endemic

Aspalathus
Genus Aspalathus:
 Aspalathus abbottii C.H.Stirt. & Muasya, endemic
 Aspalathus abietina Thunb. endemic
 Aspalathus acanthes Eckl. & Zeyh. endemic
 Aspalathus acanthiloba R.Dahlgren, endemic
 Aspalathus acanthoclada R.Dahlgren, endemic
 Aspalathus acanthophylla Eckl. & Zeyh. endemic
 Aspalathus acicularis E.Mey. indigenous
 Aspalathus acicularis E.Mey. subsp. acicularis,   indigenous
 Aspalathus acicularis E.Mey. subsp. planifolia R.Dahlgren, endemic
 Aspalathus acidota Garab. ex R.Dahlgren, endemic
 Aspalathus acifera R.Dahlgren, endemic
 Aspalathus aciloba R.Dahlgren, endemic
 Aspalathus aciphylla Harv. endemic
 Aspalathus acocksii (R.Dahlgren) R.Dahlgren, endemic
 Aspalathus aculeata Thunb. endemic
 Aspalathus acuminata Lam. indigenous
 Aspalathus acuminata Lam. subsp. acuminata,   endemic
 Aspalathus acuminata Lam. subsp. pungens (nutsThunb.) R.Dahlgren, endemic
 Aspalathus acutiflora R.Dahlgren, endemic
 Aspalathus aemula E.Mey. endemic
 Aspalathus albens L. endemic
 Aspalathus alopecurus Benth. endemic
 Aspalathus alpestris (Benth.) R.Dahlgren, endemic
 Aspalathus altissima R.Dahlgren, endemic
 Aspalathus amoena (R.Dahlgren) R.Dahlgren, endemic
 Aspalathus angustifolia (Lam.) R.Dahlgren, indigenous
 Aspalathus angustifolia (Lam.) R.Dahlgren subsp. angustifolia,   endemic
 Aspalathus angustifolia (Lam.) R.Dahlgren subsp. robusta (E.Phillips) R.Dahlgren, endemic
 Aspalathus araneosa L. endemic
 Aspalathus arenaria R.Dahlgren, endemic
 Aspalathus argyrella MacOwan, endemic
 Aspalathus argyrophanes R.Dahlgren, endemic
 Aspalathus arida E.Mey. indigenous
 Aspalathus arida E.Mey. subsp. arida,   endemic
 Aspalathus arida E.Mey. subsp. erecta (E.Mey.) R.Dahlgren, endemic
 Aspalathus arida E.Mey. subsp. procumbens (E.Mey.) R.Dahlgren, endemic
 Aspalathus aristata Compton, endemic
 Aspalathus aristifolia R.Dahlgren, endemic
 Aspalathus aspalathoides (L.) R.Dahlgren, endemic
 Aspalathus asparagoides L.f. indigenous
 Aspalathus asparagoides L.f. subsp. asparagoides,   endemic
 Aspalathus asparagoides L.f. subsp. rubro-fusca (Eckl. & Zeyh.) R.Dahlgren, endemic
 Aspalathus astroites L. endemic
 Aspalathus attenuata R.Dahlgren, indigenous
 Aspalathus aurantiaca R.Dahlgren, endemic
 Aspalathus barbata (Lam.) R.Dahlgren, endemic
 Aspalathus barbigera R.Dahlgren, endemic
 Aspalathus batodes Eckl. & Zeyh. indigenous
 Aspalathus batodes Eckl. & Zeyh. subsp. batodes,   endemic
 Aspalathus batodes Eckl. & Zeyh. subsp. spinulifolia R.Dahlgren, endemic
 Aspalathus bidouwensis Garab. ex R.Dahlgren, endemic
 Aspalathus biflora E.Mey. indigenous
 Aspalathus biflora E.Mey. subsp. biflora,   endemic
 Aspalathus biflora E.Mey. subsp. longicarpa R.Dahlgren, endemic
 Aspalathus bodkinii Bolus, endemic
 Aspalathus borboniifolia R.Dahlgren, endemic
 Aspalathus bowieana (Benth.) R.Dahlgren, endemic
 Aspalathus bracteata Thunb. endemic
 Aspalathus brevicarpa (R.Dahlgren) R.Dahlgren, endemic
 Aspalathus burchelliana Benth. endemic
 Aspalathus caespitosa R.Dahlgren, endemic
 Aspalathus calcarata Harv. endemic
 Aspalathus calcarea R.Dahlgren, endemic
 Aspalathus caledonensis R.Dahlgren, endemic
 Aspalathus callosa L. endemic
 Aspalathus campestris R.Dahlgren, endemic
 Aspalathus candicans Aiton f. endemic
 Aspalathus candidula R.Dahlgren, endemic
 Aspalathus capensis (Walp.) R.Dahlgren, endemic
 Aspalathus capitata L. endemic
 Aspalathus carnosa P.J.Bergius, endemic
 Aspalathus cephalotes Thunb. indigenous
 Aspalathus cephalotes Thunb. subsp. cephalotes,   endemic
 Aspalathus cephalotes Thunb. subsp. obscuriflora R.Dahlgren, endemic
 Aspalathus cephalotes Thunb. subsp. violacea R.Dahlgren, endemic
 Aspalathus cerrhantha Eckl. & Zeyh. endemic
 Aspalathus chenopoda L. indigenous
 Aspalathus chenopoda L. subsp. chenopoda,   endemic
 Aspalathus chenopoda L. subsp. gracilis (Eckl. & Zeyh.) R.Dahlgren, endemic
 Aspalathus chortophila Eckl. & Zeyh. indigenous
 Aspalathus chrysantha R.Dahlgren, endemic
 Aspalathus ciliaris L. endemic
 Aspalathus cinerascens E.Mey. endemic
 Aspalathus citrina R.Dahlgren, endemic
 Aspalathus cliffortiifolia R.Dahlgren, endemic
 Aspalathus cliffortioides Bolus, endemic
 Aspalathus collina Eckl. & Zeyh. indigenous
 Aspalathus collina Eckl. & Zeyh. subsp. collina,   endemic
 Aspalathus collina Eckl. & Zeyh. subsp. luculenta R.Dahlgren, endemic
 Aspalathus commutata (Vogel) R.Dahlgren, endemic
 Aspalathus compacta R.Dahlgren, endemic
 Aspalathus complicata (Benth.) R.Dahlgren, endemic
 Aspalathus comptonii R.Dahlgren, endemic
 Aspalathus concava Bolus, endemic
 Aspalathus condensata R.Dahlgren, endemic
 Aspalathus confusa R.Dahlgren, endemic
 Aspalathus congesta (R.Dahlgren) R.Dahlgren, endemic
 Aspalathus cordata (L.) R.Dahlgren, endemic
 Aspalathus cordicarpa R.Dahlgren, endemic
 Aspalathus corniculata R.Dahlgren, endemic
 Aspalathus corrudifolia P.J.Bergius, endemic
 Aspalathus costulata Benth. endemic
 Aspalathus crassisepala R.Dahlgren, endemic
 Aspalathus crenata (L.) R.Dahlgren, endemic
 Aspalathus crewiana Boatwr. & Cupido, endemic
 Aspalathus cuspidata R.Dahlgren, endemic
 Aspalathus cymbiformis DC. endemic
 Aspalathus cytisoides Lam. endemic
 Aspalathus dasyantha Eckl. & Zeyh. endemic
 Aspalathus decora R.Dahlgren, endemic
 Aspalathus densifolia Benth. endemic
 Aspalathus desertorum Bolus, endemic
 Aspalathus dianthopora E.Phillips, endemic
 Aspalathus diffusa Eckl. & Zeyh. endemic
 Aspalathus digitifolia R.Dahlgren, endemic
 Aspalathus divaricata Thunb. indigenous
 Aspalathus divaricata Thunb. subsp. divaricata,   endemic
 Aspalathus divaricata Thunb. subsp. gracilior R.Dahlgren, endemic
 Aspalathus dunsdoniana Alston ex R.Dahlgren, endemic
 Aspalathus elliptica (E.Phillips) R.Dahlgren, endemic
 Aspalathus empetrifolia (R.Dahlgren) R.Dahlgren, endemic
 Aspalathus ericifolia L. indigenous
 Aspalathus ericifolia L. subsp. ericifolia,   endemic
 Aspalathus ericifolia L. subsp. minuta R.Dahlgren, endemic
 Aspalathus ericifolia L. subsp. pusilla R.Dahlgren, endemic
 Aspalathus erythrodes Eckl. & Zeyh. endemic
 Aspalathus esterhuyseniae R.Dahlgren, endemic
 Aspalathus excelsa R.Dahlgren, endemic
 Aspalathus fasciculata (Thunb.) R.Dahlgren, endemic
 Aspalathus ferox Harv. endemic
 Aspalathus filicaulis Eckl. & Zeyh. endemic
 Aspalathus flexuosa Thunb. endemic
 Aspalathus florifera R.Dahlgren, endemic
 Aspalathus florulenta R.Dahlgren, endemic
 Aspalathus forbesii Harv. endemic
 Aspalathus fourcadei L.Bolus, endemic
 Aspalathus frankenioides DC. endemic
 Aspalathus fusca Thunb. endemic
 Aspalathus galeata E.Mey. endemic
 Aspalathus gerrardii Bolus, endemic
 Aspalathus glabrata R.Dahlgren, endemic
 Aspalathus glabrescens R.Dahlgren, endemic
 Aspalathus globosa Andrews, endemic
 Aspalathus globulosa E.Mey. endemic
 Aspalathus glossoides R.Dahlgren, endemic
 Aspalathus grandiflora Benth. endemic
 Aspalathus granulata R.Dahlgren, endemic
 Aspalathus grobleri R.Dahlgren, endemic
 Aspalathus heterophylla L.f. endemic
 Aspalathus hirta E.Mey. endemic
 Aspalathus hirta E.Mey. subsp. hirta,   endemic
 Aspalathus hirta E.Mey. subsp. stellaris R.Dahlgren, endemic
 Aspalathus hispida Thunb. indigenous
 Aspalathus hispida Thunb. subsp. albiflora (Eckl. & Zeyh.) R.Dahlgren, endemic
 Aspalathus hispida Thunb. subsp. hispida,   indigenous
 Aspalathus horizontalis (R.Dahlgren) R.Dahlgren, endemic
 Aspalathus humilis Bolus, endemic
 Aspalathus hypnoides R.Dahlgren, endemic
 Aspalathus hystrix L.f. endemic
 Aspalathus incana R.Dahlgren, endemic
 Aspalathus incompta Thunb. endemic
 Aspalathus incurva Thunb. endemic
 Aspalathus incurvifolia Vogel ex Walp. endemic
 Aspalathus inops Eckl. & Zeyh. endemic
 Aspalathus intermedia Eckl. & Zeyh. endemic
 Aspalathus intervallaris Bolus, endemic
 Aspalathus intricata Compton, indigenous
 Aspalathus intricata Compton subsp. anthospermoides (R.Dahlgren) R.Dahlgren, endemic
 Aspalathus intricata Compton subsp. intricata,   endemic
 Aspalathus intricata Compton subsp. oxyclada (Compton) R.Dahlgren, endemic
 Aspalathus isolata (R.Dahlgren) R.Dahlgren, endemic
 Aspalathus joubertiana Eckl. & Zeyh. endemic
 Aspalathus juniperina Thunb. indigenous
 Aspalathus juniperina Thunb. subsp. gracilifolia (R.Dahlgren) R.Dahlgren, endemic
 Aspalathus juniperina Thunb. subsp. grandis R.Dahlgren, endemic
 Aspalathus juniperina Thunb. subsp. juniperina,   endemic
 Aspalathus juniperina Thunb. subsp. monticola R.Dahlgren, endemic
 Aspalathus karrooensis R.Dahlgren, endemic
 Aspalathus katbergensis (R.Dahlgren) R.Dahlgren, endemic
 Aspalathus keeromsbergensis R.Dahlgren, endemic
 Aspalathus kougaensis (Garab. ex R.Dahlgren) R.Dahlgren, endemic
 Aspalathus lactea Thunb. indigenous
 Aspalathus lactea Thunb. subsp. breviloba R.Dahlgren, endemic
 Aspalathus lactea Thunb. subsp. lactea,   endemic
 Aspalathus laeta Bolus, endemic
 Aspalathus lamarckiana R.Dahlgren, endemic
 Aspalathus lanata E.Mey. endemic
 Aspalathus lanceicarpa R.Dahlgren, endemic
 Aspalathus lanceifolia R.Dahlgren, endemic
 Aspalathus lanifera R.Dahlgren, endemic
 Aspalathus laricifolia P.J.Bergius, indigenous
 Aspalathus laricifolia P.J.Bergius subsp. canescens (L.) R.Dahlgren, endemic
 Aspalathus laricifolia P.J.Bergius subsp. laricifolia,   endemic
 Aspalathus latifolia Bolus, endemic
 Aspalathus lebeckioides R.Dahlgren, endemic
 Aspalathus lenticula Bolus, endemic
 Aspalathus leptocoma Eckl. & Zeyh. endemic
 Aspalathus leptoptera Bolus, endemic
 Aspalathus leucophylla R.Dahlgren, endemic
 Aspalathus linearifolia (Burm.f.) DC., endemic
 Aspalathus linearis (Burm.f.) R.Dahlgren, endemic
 Aspalathus linguiloba R.Dahlgren, endemic
 Aspalathus longifolia Benth. endemic
 Aspalathus longipes Harv. endemic
 Aspalathus lotiflora R.Dahlgren, endemic
 Aspalathus lotoides Thunb. indigenous
 Aspalathus lotoides Thunb. subsp. lagopus (Thunb.) R.Dahlgren, endemic
 Aspalathus lotoides Thunb. subsp. lotoides,   endemic
 Aspalathus macrantha Harv. endemic
 Aspalathus macrocarpa Eckl. & Zeyh. endemic
 Aspalathus marginalis Eckl. & Zeyh. endemic
 Aspalathus marginata Harv. endemic
 Aspalathus microphylla DC. endemic
 Aspalathus millefolia R.Dahlgren, endemic
 Aspalathus monosperma (DC.) R.Dahlgren, endemic
 Aspalathus mundiana Eckl. & Zeyh. endemic
 Aspalathus muraltioides Eckl. & Zeyh. endemic
 Aspalathus myrtillifolia Benth. endemic
 Aspalathus neglecta T.M.Salter, endemic
 Aspalathus nigra L. endemic
 Aspalathus nivea Thunb. endemic
 Aspalathus nudiflora Harv. endemic
 Aspalathus obliqua R.Dahlgren, endemic
 Aspalathus oblongifolia R.Dahlgren, endemic
 Aspalathus obtusata Thunb. endemic
 Aspalathus obtusifolia R.Dahlgren, endemic
 Aspalathus odontoloba R.Dahlgren, endemic
 Aspalathus oliveri R.Dahlgren, endemic
 Aspalathus opaca Eckl. & Zeyh. indigenous
 Aspalathus opaca Eckl. & Zeyh. subsp. opaca,   endemic
 Aspalathus opaca Eckl. & Zeyh. subsp. pappeana (Harv.) R.Dahlgren, endemic
 Aspalathus opaca Eckl. & Zeyh. subsp. rostriloba R.Dahlgren, endemic
 Aspalathus orbiculata Benth. endemic
 Aspalathus pachyloba Benth. indigenous
 Aspalathus pachyloba Benth. subsp. macroclada R.Dahlgren, endemic
 Aspalathus pachyloba Benth. subsp. pachyloba,   endemic
 Aspalathus pachyloba Benth. subsp. rugulicarpa R.Dahlgren, endemic
 Aspalathus pachyloba Benth. subsp. succulentifolia R.Dahlgren, accepted as Aspalathus pachyloba Benth. subsp. villicaulis R.Dahlgren, present
 Aspalathus pachyloba Benth. subsp. villicaulis R.Dahlgren, endemic
 Aspalathus pallescens Eckl. & Zeyh. endemic
 Aspalathus pallidiflora R.Dahlgren, endemic
 Aspalathus pappeana Harv. accepted as Aspalathus opaca Eckl. & Zeyh. subsp. pappeana (Harv.) R.Dahlgren,  present
 Aspalathus parviflora P.J.Bergius, endemic
 Aspalathus patens Garab. ex R.Dahlgren, endemic
 Aspalathus pedicellata Harv. endemic
 Aspalathus pedunculata Houtt., endemic
 Aspalathus pendula R.Dahlgren, endemic
 Aspalathus perfoliata (Lam.) R.Dahlgren, indigenous
 Aspalathus perfoliata (Lam.) R.Dahlgren subsp. perfoliata,   endemic
 Aspalathus perfoliata (Lam.) R.Dahlgren subsp. phillipsii R.Dahlgren, endemic
 Aspalathus perforata (Thunb.) R.Dahlgren, endemic
 Aspalathus petersonii R.Dahlgren, endemic
 Aspalathus pigmentosa R.Dahlgren, endemic
 Aspalathus pilantha R.Dahlgren, endemic
 Aspalathus pinea Thunb. indigenous
 Aspalathus pinea Thunb. subsp. caudata R.Dahlgren, endemic
 Aspalathus pinea Thunb. subsp. pinea,   endemic
 Aspalathus pinguis Thunb. indigenous
 Aspalathus pinguis Thunb. subsp. australis R.Dahlgren, endemic
 Aspalathus pinguis Thunb. subsp. longissima R.Dahlgren, endemic
 Aspalathus pinguis Thunb. subsp. occidentalis R.Dahlgren, endemic
 Aspalathus pinguis Thunb. subsp. pinguis,   endemic
 Aspalathus polycephala E.Mey. indigenous
 Aspalathus polycephala E.Mey. subsp. lanatifolia R.Dahlgren, endemic
 Aspalathus polycephala E.Mey. subsp. polycephala,   endemic
 Aspalathus polycephala E.Mey. subsp. rigida (Schltr.) R.Dahlgren, endemic
 Aspalathus potbergensis R.Dahlgren, endemic
 Aspalathus proboscidea R.Dahlgren, endemic
 Aspalathus prostrata Eckl. & Zeyh. endemic
 Aspalathus psoraleoides (C.Presl) Benth. endemic
 Aspalathus puberula (Eckl. & Zeyh.) R.Dahlgren, endemic
 Aspalathus pulicifolia R.Dahlgren, endemic
 Aspalathus pycnantha R.Dahlgren, endemic
 Aspalathus quadrata L.Bolus, endemic
 Aspalathus quinquefolia L. indigenous
 Aspalathus quinquefolia L. subsp. compacta R.Dahlgren, endemic
 Aspalathus quinquefolia L. subsp. hispida (Thunb.) R.Dahlgren, endemic
 Aspalathus quinquefolia L. subsp. quinquefolia,   endemic
 Aspalathus quinquefolia L. subsp. virgata (Thunb.) R.Dahlgren, endemic
 Aspalathus radiata Garab. ex R.Dahlgren, indigenous
 Aspalathus radiata Garab. ex R.Dahlgren subsp. pseudosericea R.Dahlgren, endemic
 Aspalathus radiata Garab. ex R.Dahlgren subsp. radiata,   endemic
 Aspalathus ramosissima R.Dahlgren, endemic
 Aspalathus ramulosa E.Mey. endemic
 Aspalathus rectistyla R.Dahlgren, endemic
 Aspalathus recurva Benth. endemic
 Aspalathus recurvispina R.Dahlgren, endemic
 Aspalathus repens R.Dahlgren, endemic
 Aspalathus retroflexa L. indigenous
 Aspalathus retroflexa L. subsp. angustipetala R.Dahlgren, endemic
 Aspalathus retroflexa L. subsp. bicolor (Eckl. & Zeyh.) R.Dahlgren, endemic
 Aspalathus retroflexa L. subsp. retroflexa,   endemic
 Aspalathus rigidifolia R.Dahlgren, endemic
 Aspalathus rosea Garab. ex R.Dahlgren, endemic
 Aspalathus rostrata Benth. endemic
 Aspalathus rostripetala R.Dahlgren, endemic
 Aspalathus rubens Thunb. endemic
 Aspalathus rubiginosa R.Dahlgren, endemic
 Aspalathus rugosa Thunb. endemic
 Aspalathus rupestris R.Dahlgren, endemic
 Aspalathus rycroftii R.Dahlgren, endemic
 Aspalathus salicifolia R.Dahlgren, endemic
 Aspalathus salteri L.Bolus, endemic
 Aspalathus sanguinea Thunb. indigenous
 Aspalathus sanguinea Thunb. subsp. foliosa R.Dahlgren, endemic
 Aspalathus sanguinea Thunb. subsp. sanguinea,   endemic
 Aspalathus sceptrum-aureum R.Dahlgren, endemic
 Aspalathus secunda E.Mey. endemic
 Aspalathus securifolia Eckl. & Zeyh. endemic
 Aspalathus sericea P.J.Bergius, endemic
 Aspalathus serpens R.Dahlgren, endemic
 Aspalathus setacea Eckl. & Zeyh. endemic
 Aspalathus shawii L.Bolus, indigenous
 Aspalathus shawii L.Bolus subsp. glabripetala (R.Dahlgren) R.Dahlgren, endemic
 Aspalathus shawii L.Bolus subsp. longispica (R.Dahlgren) R.Dahlgren, endemic
 Aspalathus shawii L.Bolus subsp. shawii,   endemic
 Aspalathus simii Bolus, endemic
 Aspalathus singuliflora R.Dahlgren, endemic
 Aspalathus smithii R.Dahlgren, endemic
 Aspalathus spectabilis R.Dahlgren, endemic
 Aspalathus spicata Thunb. endemic
 Aspalathus spiculata R.Dahlgren, endemic
 Aspalathus spinescens Thunb. indigenous
 Aspalathus spinescens Thunb. subsp. lepida (E.Mey.) R.Dahlgren, endemic
 Aspalathus spinescens Thunb. subsp. spinescens,   endemic
 Aspalathus spinosa L. endemic
 Aspalathus spinosa L. subsp. flavispina (C.Presl ex Benth.) R.Dahlgren, endemic
 Aspalathus spinosa L. subsp. glauca (Eckl. & Zeyh.) R.Dahlgren, endemic
 Aspalathus spinosa L. subsp. spinosa,   endemic
 Aspalathus spinosissima R.Dahlgren, indigenous
 Aspalathus spinosissima R.Dahlgren subsp. spinosissima,   endemic
 Aspalathus spinosissima R.Dahlgren subsp. tenuiflora R.Dahlgren, endemic
 Aspalathus stenophylla Eckl. & Zeyh. endemic
 Aspalathus steudeliana Brongn. endemic
 Aspalathus stokoei L.Bolus, endemic
 Aspalathus stricticlada (R.Dahlgren) R.Dahlgren, endemic
 Aspalathus suaveolens Eckl. & Zeyh. endemic
 Aspalathus submissa R.Dahlgren, endemic
 Aspalathus subtingens Eckl. & Zeyh. endemic
 Aspalathus subulata Thunb. endemic
 Aspalathus sulphurea R.Dahlgren, endemic
 Aspalathus taylorii R.Dahlgren, endemic
 Aspalathus tenuissima R.Dahlgren, endemic
 Aspalathus teres Eckl. & Zeyh. indigenous
 Aspalathus teres Eckl. & Zeyh. subsp. teres,   endemic
 Aspalathus teres Eckl. & Zeyh. subsp. thodei R.Dahlgren, endemic
 Aspalathus ternata (Thunb.) Druce, endemic
 Aspalathus theresae Cupido, endemic
 Aspalathus tridentata L. indigenous
 Aspalathus tridentata L. subsp. fragilis R.Dahlgren, endemic
 Aspalathus tridentata L. subsp. rotunda R.Dahlgren, endemic
 Aspalathus tridentata L. subsp. staurantha (Eckl. & Zeyh.) R.Dahlgren, endemic
 Aspalathus tridentata L. subsp. tridentata,   endemic
 Aspalathus triquetra Thunb. endemic
 Aspalathus truncata Eckl. & Zeyh. endemic
 Aspalathus tuberculata Walp. endemic
 Aspalathus tulbaghensis R.Dahlgren, endemic
 Aspalathus tylodes Eckl. & Zeyh. endemic
 Aspalathus ulicina Eckl. & Zeyh. indigenous
 Aspalathus ulicina Eckl. & Zeyh. subsp. kardouwensis R.Dahlgren, endemic
 Aspalathus ulicina Eckl. & Zeyh. subsp. ulicina,   endemic
 Aspalathus uniflora L. endemic
 Aspalathus vacciniifolia R.Dahlgren, endemic
 Aspalathus varians Eckl. & Zeyh. endemic
 Aspalathus variegata Eckl. & Zeyh. endemic
 Aspalathus venosa E.Mey. endemic
 Aspalathus verbasciformis R.Dahlgren, endemic
 Aspalathus vermiculata Lam. endemic
 Aspalathus villosa Thunb. endemic
 Aspalathus vulnerans Thunb. endemic
 Aspalathus vulpina Garab. ex R.Dahlgren, endemic
 Aspalathus willdenowiana Benth. endemic
 Aspalathus wittebergensis Compton & P.E.Barnes, endemic
 Aspalathus wurmbeana E.Mey. endemic
 Aspalathus zeyheri (Harv.) R.Dahlgren, endemic

Astragalus
Genus Astragalus:
 Astragalus atropilosulus (Hochst.) Bunge, indigenous
 Astragalus atropilosulus (Hochst.) Bunge subsp. burkeanus (Harv.) J.B.Gillett var. burkeanus,   indigenous
 Astragalus bisulcatus (Hook.) A.Gray, not indigenous, naturalised

Baphia
Genus Baphia:
 Baphia massaiensis Taub. indigenous
 Baphia massaiensis Taub. subsp. obovata (Schinz) Brummitt var. obovata,   indigenous
 Baphia racemosa (Hochst.) Baker, endemic

Bauhinia
Genus Bauhinia:
 Bauhinia bowkeri Harv. endemic
 Bauhinia forficata Link, not indigenous, cultivated, naturalised, invasive
 Bauhinia galpinii N.E.Br. indigenous
 Bauhinia marlothii Engl. accepted as Adenolobus pechuelii (Kuntze) Torre & Hillc. subsp. pechuelii
 Bauhinia natalensis Oliv. ex Hook. endemic
 Bauhinia petersiana Bolle, indigenous
 Bauhinia petersiana Bolle subsp. macrantha (Oliv.) Brummitt & J.H.Ross, indigenous
 Bauhinia purpurea L. not indigenous, naturalised, invasive
 Bauhinia tomentosa L. indigenous
 Bauhinia variegata L. not indigenous, naturalised, invasive
 Bauhinia variegata L. var. variegata,   not indigenous, naturalised, invasive

Bituminaria
Genus Bituminaria:
 Bituminaria acaulis (Stev.) C.H.Stirt. indigenous
 Bituminaria bituminosa (L.) C.H.Stirt. indigenous

Bolusafra
Genus Bolusafra:
 Bolusafra bituminosa (L.) Kuntze, endemic

Bolusanthus
Genus Bolusanthus:
 Bolusanthus speciosus (Bolus) Harms, indigenous

Bolusia
Genus Bolusia:
 Bolusia acuminata (DC.) Polhill, indigenous
 Bolusia capensis Benth. accepted as Bolusia acuminata (DC.) Polhill, present

Borbonia
Genus Borbonia:
 Borbonia laevigata L. accepted as Liparia laevigata (L.) Thunb. indigenous

Brachystegia
Genus Brachystegia:
 Brachystegia spiciformis Benth. indigenous
 Brachystegia spiciformis Benth. var. schmitzii Hoyle, accepted as Brachystegia spiciformis Benth.
 Brachystegia spiciformis Benth. var. spiciformis, endemic

Burkea
Genus Burkea:
 Burkea africana Hook. indigenous
 Burkea africana Hook. var. cordata Welw. ex Oliv. accepted as Burkea africana Hook. indigenous

Caesalpinia
Genus Caesalpinia:
 Caesalpinia bonduc (L.) Roxb. accepted as Guilandina bonduc L. indigenous
 Caesalpinia bonducella (L.) Fleming, accepted as Guilandina bonduc L. indigenous
 Caesalpinia bracteata Germish. endemic
 Caesalpinia decapetala (Roth) Alston, not indigenous, naturalised, invasive
 Caesalpinia gilliesii (Wall. ex Hook.) D.Dietr. not indigenous, naturalised, invasive
 Caesalpinia pulcherrima (L.) Sw. not indigenous, naturalised
 Caesalpinia rostrata N.E.Br. indigenous
 Caesalpinia spinosa (Molina) Kuntze, not indigenous, naturalised

Cajanus
Genus Cajanus:
 Cajanus cajan (L.) Millsp. not indigenous, cultivated, naturalised

Calliandra
Genus Calliandra:
 Calliandra redacta (J.H.Ross) Thulin & Asfaw, endemic

Calobota
Genus Calobota:
 Calobota acanthoclada (Dinter) Boatwr. & B.-E.van Wyk, indigenous
 Calobota angustifolia (E.Mey.) Boatwr. & B.-E.van Wyk, indigenous
 Calobota cinerea (E.Mey.) Boatwr. & B.-E.van Wyk, indigenous
 Calobota cuspidosa (Burch.) Boatwr. & B.-E.van Wyk, indigenous
 Calobota cytisoides (Berg.) Eckl. & Zeyh. endemic
 Calobota elongata (Thunb.) Boatwr. & B.-E.van Wyk, endemic
 Calobota halenbergensis (Merxm. & Schreib.) Boatwr. & B.-E.van Wyk, indigenous
 Calobota linearifolia (E.Mey.) Boatwr. & B.-E.van Wyk, indigenous
 Calobota lotononoides (Schltr.) Boatwr. & B.-E.van Wyk, endemic
 Calobota psiloloba (E.Mey.) Boatwr. & B.-E.van Wyk, endemic
 Calobota pungens (Thunb.) Boatwr. & B.-E.van Wyk, endemic
 Calobota sericea (Thunb.) Boatwr. & B.-E.van Wyk, endemic
 Calobota spinescens (Harv.) Boatwr. & B.-E.van Wyk, indigenous

Calpurnia
Genus Calpurnia:
 Calpurnia aurea (Aiton) Benth. indigenous
 Calpurnia aurea (Aiton) Benth. subsp. aurea,   indigenous
 Calpurnia aurea (Aiton) Benth. subsp. sylvatica (Burch.) Brummitt, accepted as Calpurnia aurea (Aiton) Benth. subsp. aurea,   present
 Calpurnia capensis (Burm.f.) Druce, endemic
 Calpurnia floribunda Harv. endemic
 Calpurnia glabrata Brummitt, indigenous
 Calpurnia intrusa (R.Br.in W.T.Aiton) E.Mey. endemic
 Calpurnia reflexa A.J.Beaumont, indigenous
 Calpurnia sericea Harv. indigenous
 Calpurnia villosa Harv. accepted as Calpurnia intrusa (R.Br.in W.T.Aiton) E.Mey. present
 Calpurnia villosa Harv. var. intrusa (R.Br. ex Aiton f.) E.Mey. accepted as Calpurnia intrusa (R.Br.in W.T.Aiton) E.Mey. present
 Calpurnia woodii Schinz, endemic

Canavalia
Genus Canavalia:
 Canavalia africana Dunn, indigenous
 Canavalia bonariensis Lindl. indigenous
 Canavalia cryptodon Meisn. accepted as Canavalia bonariensis Lindl. indigenous
 Canavalia ensiformis (L.) DC. indigenous
 Canavalia ferruginea Piper, accepted as Canavalia africana Dunn, indigenous
 Canavalia gladiata (Jacq.) DC. not indigenous, naturalised
 Canavalia maritima Thouars, accepted as Canavalia rosea (Sw.) DC. present
 Canavalia monodon E.Mey. accepted as Canavalia bonariensis Lindl. indigenous
 Canavalia obtusifolia (Lam.) DC. accepted as Canavalia rosea (Sw.) DC.
 Canavalia rosea (Sw.) DC. indigenous
 Canavalia virosa (Roxb.) Wight & Arn. accepted as Canavalia africana Dunn, indigenous

Capassa
Genus Capassa:
 Capassa violacea Klotzsch, accepted as Philenoptera violacea (Klotzsch) Schrire, indigenous

Cassia
Genus Cassia:
 Cassia abbreviata Oliv. indigenous
 Cassia abbreviata Oliv. subsp. beareana (Holmes) Brenan, indigenous

Ceratonia
Genus Ceratonia:
 Ceratonia siliqua L. not indigenous, cultivated, naturalised

Chamaecrista
Genus Chamaecrista:
 Chamaecrista absus (L.) H.S.Irwin & Barneby, indigenous
 Chamaecrista biensis (Steyaert) Lock, indigenous
 Chamaecrista capensis (Thunb.) E.Mey. indigenous
 Chamaecrista capensis (Thunb.) E.Mey. var. capensis,   indigenous
 Chamaecrista capensis (Thunb.) E.Mey. var. flavescens (Thunb.) E.Mey. indigenous
 Chamaecrista comosa E.Mey. indigenous
 Chamaecrista comosa E.Mey. var. capricornia (Steyaert) Lock, indigenous
 Chamaecrista comosa E.Mey. var. comosa,   indigenous
 Chamaecrista huillensis (MendonÃ§a & Torre) Lock, indigenous
 Chamaecrista mimosoides (L.) Greene, indigenous
 Chamaecrista plumosa E.Mey. indigenous
 Chamaecrista plumosa E.Mey. var. erecta (Schorn & Gordon-Gray) Lock, endemic
 Chamaecrista plumosa E.Mey. var. plumosa,   indigenous
 Chamaecrista stricta E.Mey. indigenous

Chamaecytisus
Genus Chamaecytisus:
 Chamaecytisus prolifer (L.f.) Link subsp. palmensis (Christ) G.Kunkel, not indigenous, cultivated, naturalised, invasive

Chasmone
Genus Chasmone:
 Chasmone andrewsiana E.Mey. accepted as Argyrolobium tomentosum (Andrews) Druce, present
 Chasmone andrewsiana E.Mey. var. umbellata E.Mey. accepted as Argyrolobium tomentosum (Andrews) Druce
 Chasmone apiculata E.Mey. accepted as Argyrolobium molle Eckl. & Zeyh. present
 Chasmone argentea (Jacq.) E.Mey. var. pilosa E.Mey. accepted as Argyrolobium argenteum Eckl. & Zeyh. present
 Chasmone diversifolia E.Mey. accepted as Argyrolobium speciosum Eckl. & Zeyh. present
 Chasmone goodioides Meisn. accepted as Argyrolobium crassifolium Eckl. & Zeyh. present
 Chasmone holosericea E.Mey. var. incana Meisn. accepted as Argyrolobium incanum Eckl. & Zeyh. present
 Chasmone obcordata E.Mey. accepted as Argyrolobium trifoliatum (Thunb.) Druce, present
 Chasmone sessiliflora E.Mey. var. interrupta E.Mey. accepted as Argyrolobium candicans Eckl. & Zeyh. present
 Chasmone sessiliflora E.Mey. var. parvifolia E.Mey. accepted as Argyrolobium candicans Eckl. & Zeyh. present
 Chasmone stricta E.Mey. accepted as Argyrolobium pauciflorum Eckl. & Zeyh. present
 Chasmone venosa  E.Mey. accepted as Argyrolobium molle Eckl. & Zeyh. present
 Chasmone venosa E.Mey. var. obscura E.Mey. accepted as Argyrolobium molle Eckl. & Zeyh. present
 Chasmone verticillata E.Mey. accepted as Argyrolobium stipulaceum Eckl. & Zeyh. present

Chirocalyx
Genus Chirocalyx:
 Chirocalyx mollissimus Meisn. accepted as Erythrina latissima E.Mey. present

Clitoria
Genus Clitoria:
 Clitoria ternatea L. var. ternatea,   not indigenous, naturalised

Coelidium
Genus Coelidium:
 Coelidium amphithaleoides Dummer, accepted as Amphithalea muraltioides (Benth.) A.L.Schutte, present
 Coelidium bowiei Benth. accepted as Amphithalea bowiei (Benth.) A.L.Schutte, present
 Coelidium bullatum Benth. accepted as Amphithalea bullata (Benth.) A.L.Schutte, present
 Coelidium cedarbergense Granby, accepted as Amphithalea cedarbergensis (Granby) A.L.Schutte, present
 Coelidium ciliare (Eckl. & Zeyh.) Walp. accepted as Amphithalea ciliaris Eckl. & Zeyh. present
 Coelidium cymbifolium C.A.Sm. accepted as Amphithalea cymbifolia (C.A.Sm.) A.L.Schutte, present
 Coelidium dahlgrenii Granby, accepted as Amphithalea dahlgrenii (Granby) A.L.Schutte, present
 Coelidium esterhuyseniae Granby, accepted as Amphithalea esterhuyseniae (Granby) A.L.Schutte, present
 Coelidium flavum Granby, accepted as Amphithalea flava (Granby) A.L.Schutte, present
 Coelidium humile Schltr. accepted as Amphithalea monticola A.L.Schutte, present
 Coelidium minimum Granby, accepted as Amphithalea minima (Granby) A.L.Schutte, present
 Coelidium muirii Granby, accepted as Amphithalea muirii (Granby) A.L.Schutte, present
 Coelidium muraltioides Benth. accepted as Amphithalea muraltioides (Benth.) A.L.Schutte, present
 Coelidium obtusilobum Granby, accepted as Amphithalea obtusiloba (Granby) A.L.Schutte, present
 Coelidium pageae L.Bolus, accepted as Amphithalea pageae (L.Bolus) A.L.Schutte, present
 Coelidium parvifolium (Thunb.) Druce, accepted as Amphithalea parvifolia (Thunb.) A.L.Schutte, present
 Coelidium perplexum (Eckl. & Zeyh.) Granby, accepted as Amphithalea perplexa Eckl. & Zeyh. present
 Coelidium purpureum Granby, accepted as Amphithalea purpurea (Granby) A.L.Schutte, present
 Coelidium spinosum Harv. accepted as Amphithalea spinosa (Harv.) A.L.Schutte, present
 Coelidium tortile (E.Mey.) Druce, accepted as Amphithalea tortilis (E.Mey.) Steud. present
 Coelidium villosum (Schltr.) Granby, accepted as Amphithalea villosa Schltr. present
 Coelidium vlokii A.L.Schutte & B.-E.van Wyk, accepted as Amphithalea vlokii (A.L.Schutte & B.-E.van Wyk) A.L.Schutte, present

Colophospermum
Genus Colophospermum:
 Colophospermum mopane (J.Kirk ex Benth.) J.Kirk ex J.Leonard, indigenous

Colutea
Genus Colutea:
 Colutea frutescens L. accepted as Lessertia frutescens (L.) Goldblatt & J.C.Manning subsp. frutescens,   indigenous

Copisma
Genus Copisma:
 Copisma paniculatum E.Mey. accepted as Rhynchosia totta (Thunb.) DC. var. totta,   indigenous
 Copisma pilosum E.Mey. accepted as Rhynchosia totta (Thunb.) DC. var. totta,   indigenous
 Copisma tottum (Thunb.) E.Mey. accepted as Rhynchosia totta (Thunb.) DC. var. totta,   indigenous

Cordyla
Genus Cordyla:
 Cordyla africana Lour. indigenous

Craibia
Genus Craibia:
 Craibia zimmermannii (Harms) Dunn, indigenous

Crotalaria
Genus Crotalaria:
 Crotalaria agatiflora Schweinf. not indigenous, naturalised, invasive
 Crotalaria anthyllopsis Welw. ex Baker, indigenous
 Crotalaria argyraea Welw. ex Baker, indigenous
 Crotalaria barkae Schweinf. indigenous
 Crotalaria barkae Schweinf. subsp. barkae,   indigenous
 Crotalaria barnabassii Dinter ex Baker f. indigenous
 Crotalaria brachycarpa (Benth.) Burtt Davy ex I.Verd. accepted as Crotalaria magaliesbergensis A.S.Flores & Sch.Rodr. indigenous
 Crotalaria brevidens Benth. var. intermedia (Kotschy) Polhill, not indigenous, naturalised
 Crotalaria burkeana Benth. indigenous
 Crotalaria capensis Jacq. indigenous
 Crotalaria damarensis Engl. indigenous
 Crotalaria diffusa E.Mey. accepted as Crotalaria excisa (Thunb.) Baker f. subsp. excisa,   indigenous
 Crotalaria dinteri Schinz, indigenous
 Crotalaria distans Benth. indigenous
 Crotalaria distans Benth. subsp. distans,   indigenous
 Crotalaria distans Benth. subsp. mediocris Polhill, indigenous
 Crotalaria doidgeae I.Verd. endemic
 Crotalaria dura J.M.Wood & M.S.Evans, indigenous
 Crotalaria dura J.M.Wood & M.S.Evans subsp. dura,   endemic
 Crotalaria dura J.M.Wood & M.S.Evans subsp. mozambica Polhill, indigenous
 Crotalaria eckloniana C.Presl, accepted as Crotalaria excisa (Thunb.) Baker f. subsp. excisa,   present
 Crotalaria effusa E.Mey. accepted as Crotalaria humilis Eckl. & Zeyh. indigenous
 Crotalaria eremicola Baker f. indigenous
 Crotalaria eremicola Baker f. subsp. eremicola,   indigenous
 Crotalaria excisa (Thunb.) Baker f. endemic
 Crotalaria excisa (Thunb.) Baker f. subsp. excisa,   endemic
 Crotalaria excisa (Thunb.) Baker f. subsp. namaquensis Polhill, endemic
 Crotalaria gazensis Baker f. indigenous
 Crotalaria gazensis Baker f. subsp. herbacea Polhill, indigenous
 Crotalaria globifera E.Mey. indigenous
 Crotalaria griquensis L.Bolus, indigenous
 Crotalaria humilis Eckl. & Zeyh. endemic
 Crotalaria juncea L. not indigenous, naturalised
 Crotalaria laburnifolia L. indigenous
 Crotalaria laburnifolia L. subsp. australis (Baker f.) Polhill, indigenous
 Crotalaria laburnifolia L. subsp. laburnifolia,   indigenous
 Crotalaria lanceolata E.Mey. indigenous
 Crotalaria lanceolata E.Mey. subsp. lanceolata,   indigenous
 Crotalaria lebeckioides Bond, endemic
 Crotalaria leubnitziana Schinz, indigenous
 Crotalaria longidens Burtt Davy ex I.Verd. endemic
 Crotalaria lotoides Benth. indigenous
 Crotalaria macrocarpa E.Mey. indigenous
 Crotalaria macrocarpa E.Mey. subsp. macrocarpa,   endemic
 Crotalaria magaliesbergensis A.S.Flores & Sch.Rodr. endemic
 Crotalaria meyeriana Steud. indigenous
 Crotalaria mollii Polhill, indigenous
 Crotalaria mollis E.Mey. accepted as Crotalaria meyeriana Steud. indigenous
 Crotalaria monophylla Germish. endemic
 Crotalaria monteiroi Taub. ex Baker f. indigenous
 Crotalaria monteiroi Taub. ex Baker f. var. galpinii Burtt Davy ex I.Verd. indigenous
 Crotalaria monteiroi Taub. ex Baker f. var. monteiroi,   indigenous
 Crotalaria natalensis Baker f. endemic
 Crotalaria natalitia Meisn. indigenous
 Crotalaria natalitia Meisn. var. natalitia,   indigenous
 Crotalaria obscura DC. endemic
 Crotalaria orientalis Burtt Davy ex I.Verd. indigenous
 Crotalaria orientalis Burtt Davy ex I.Verd. subsp. allenii (I.Verd.) Polhill & A.Schreib. indigenous
 Crotalaria orientalis Burtt Davy ex I.Verd. subsp. orientalis,   indigenous
 Crotalaria pallida Aiton, indigenous
 Crotalaria pallida Aiton var. pallida,   indigenous
 Crotalaria pearsonii Baker f. endemic
 Crotalaria pisicarpa Welw. ex Baker, indigenous
 Crotalaria podocarpa DC. indigenous
 Crotalaria prolifera E.Mey. accepted as Leobordea prolifera (E.Mey.) Eckl. & Zeyh. indigenous
 Crotalaria racemosa Thunb. accepted as Crotalaria excisa (Thunb.) Baker f. subsp. namaquensis Polhill, indigenous
 Crotalaria recta Steud. ex A.Rich. indigenous
 Crotalaria rhodesiae Baker f. indigenous
 Crotalaria schinzii Baker f. indigenous
 Crotalaria schlechteri Baker f. indigenous
 Crotalaria spartea Baker, indigenous
 Crotalaria spartioides DC. indigenous
 Crotalaria spectabilis Roth, not indigenous, naturalised
 Crotalaria sphaerocarpa Perr. ex DC. indigenous
 Crotalaria sphaerocarpa Perr. ex DC. subsp. sphaerocarpa,   indigenous
 Crotalaria steudneri Schweinf. indigenous
 Crotalaria thunbergiana Vogel ex Walp. accepted as Crotalaria excisa (Thunb.) Baker f. subsp. excisa,   indigenous
 Crotalaria vasculosa Wall. ex Benth. indigenous
 Crotalaria virgulata Klotzsch, indigenous
 Crotalaria virgulata Klotzsch subsp. grantiana (Harv.) Polhill, indigenous
 Crotalaria virgultalis Burch. ex DC. indigenous

Cullen
Genus Cullen:
 Cullen biflora (Harv.) C.H.Stirt. indigenous
 Cullen holubii (Burtt Davy) C.H.Stirt. endemic
 Cullen jaubertiana (Fenzl) C.H.Stirt. indigenous
 Cullen obtusifolia (DC.) C.H.Stirt. accepted as Cullen tomentosum (Thunb.) J.W.Grimes, present
 Cullen tomentosum (Thunb.) J.W.Grimes, indigenous

Cyamopsis
Genus Cyamopsis:
 Cyamopsis dentata (N.E.Br.) Torre, indigenous
 Cyamopsis serrata Schinz, indigenous
 Cyamopsis tetragonoloba (L.) Taub. not indigenous, naturalised

Cyclopia
Genus Cyclopia:
 Cyclopia alopecuroides A.L.Schutte, endemic
 Cyclopia alpina A.L.Schutte, endemic
 Cyclopia aurescens Kies, endemic
 Cyclopia aurescens Kies var. glauca Kies, accepted as Cyclopia buxifolia (Burm.f.) Kies, present
 Cyclopia bolusii Hofmeyr & E.Phillips, endemic
 Cyclopia bowieana Harv. endemic
 Cyclopia burtonii Hofmeyr & E.Phillips, endemic
 Cyclopia buxifolia (Burm.f.) Kies, endemic
 Cyclopia capensis T.M.Salter, accepted as Cyclopia galioides (P.J.Bergius) DC., present
 Cyclopia dregeana Kies, accepted as Cyclopia buxifolia (Burm.f.) Kies, present
 Cyclopia falcata (Harv.) Kies, endemic
 Cyclopia falcata (Harv.) Kies var. ovata Kies, accepted as Cyclopia buxifolia (Burm.f.) Kies, present
 Cyclopia filiformis Kies, endemic
 Cyclopia galioides (P.J.Bergius) DC., endemic
 Cyclopia genistoides (L.) R.Br., endemic
 Cyclopia genistoides (L.) R.Br. var. heterophylla (Eckl. & Zeyh.) Harv. accepted as Cyclopia genistoides (L.) R.Br., present
 Cyclopia genistoides (L.) R.Br. var. ovalifolia Kies, accepted as Cyclopia alpina A.L.Schutte, present
 Cyclopia genistoides (L.) R.Br. var. teretifolia (Eckl. & Zeyh.) Kies, accepted as Cyclopia genistoides (L.) R.Br., present
 Cyclopia glabra (Hofmeyr & E.Phillips) A.L.Schutte, endemic
 Cyclopia intermedia E.Mey. endemic
 Cyclopia latifolia DC., endemic
 Cyclopia laxiflora Benth. endemic
 Cyclopia longifolia Vogel, endemic
 Cyclopia maculata (Andrews) Kies, endemic
 Cyclopia meyeriana Walp. endemic
 Cyclopia montana Hofmeyr & E.Phillips, accepted as Cyclopia meyeriana Walp. indigenous
 Cyclopia montana Hofmeyr & E.Phillips var. glabra Hofmeyr & E.Phillips, accepted as Cyclopia glabra (Hofmeyr & E.Phillips) A.L.Schutte, indigenous
 Cyclopia plicata Kies, endemic
 Cyclopia pubescens Eckl. & Zeyh. endemic
 Cyclopia sessiliflora Eckl. & Zeyh., endemic
 Cyclopia squamosa A.L.Schutte, endemic
 Cyclopia subternata Vogel, endemic
 Cyclopia subternata Vogel var. laxiflora (Benth.) Kies, accepted as Cyclopia laxiflora Benth. present

Cytisus
Genus Cytisus:
 Cytisus candicans (L.) Lam. accepted as Genista monspessulana (L.) L.A.S.Johnson, not indigenous, naturalised
 Cytisus scoparius (L.) Link, not indigenous, naturalised, invasive

Dalbergia
Genus Dalbergia:
 Dalbergia armata E.Mey. indigenous
 Dalbergia glandulosa Dunkley, accepted as Dalbergia martinii F.White
 Dalbergia melanoxylon Guill. & Perr. indigenous
 Dalbergia multijuga E.Mey. endemic
 Dalbergia nitidula Baker, indigenous
 Dalbergia obovata E.Mey. indigenous
 Dalbergia sissoo Roxb. ex DC. not indigenous, naturalised

Decorsea
Genus Decorsea:
 Decorsea galpinii (Burtt Davy) Verdc. endemic
 Decorsea schlechteri (Harms) Verdc. indigenous

Derris
Genus Derris:
 Derris trifoliata Lour. endemic
 Derris violacea (Klotzsch) Harms, accepted as Philenoptera violacea (Klotzsch) Schrire, indigenous

Desmanthus
Genus Desmanthus:
 Desmanthus virgatus (L.) Willd. not indigenous, naturalised

Desmodium
Genus Desmodium:
 Desmodium adscendens (Sw.) DC. indigenous
 Desmodium adscendens (Sw.) DC. var. robustum B.G.Schub. indigenous
 Desmodium asperum (Poir.) Desr. indigenous
 Desmodium barbatum (L.) Benth. indigenous
 Desmodium barbatum (L.) Benth. var. dimorphum (Welw. ex Baker) B.G.Schub. indigenous
 Desmodium dregeanum Benth. indigenous
 Desmodium gangeticum (L.) DC. indigenous
 Desmodium incanum DC. not indigenous, naturalised
 Desmodium repandum (Vahl) DC. indigenous
 Desmodium salicifolium (Poir.) DC. indigenous
 Desmodium salicifolium (Poir.) DC. var. salicifolium,   indigenous
 Desmodium setigerum (E.Mey.) Benth. ex Harv. indigenous
 Desmodium tortuosum (Sw.) DC. not indigenous, naturalised
 Desmodium uncinatum (Jacq.) DC. not indigenous, cultivated, naturalised, invasive
 Desmodium velutinum (Willd.) DC. indigenous

Dialium
Genus Dialium:
 Dialium schlechteri Harms, indigenous

Dichilus
Genus Dichilus:
 Dichilus gracilis Eckl. & Zeyh. indigenous
 Dichilus lebeckioides DC. indigenous
 Dichilus obovatus E.Mey. accepted as Argyrolobium argenteum Eckl. & Zeyh. present
 Dichilus pilosus Conrath ex Schinz, endemic
 Dichilus reflexus (N.E.Br.) A.L.Schutte, indigenous
 Dichilus strictus E.Mey. indigenous

Dichrostachys
Genus Dichrostachys:
 Dichrostachys cinerea (L.) Wight & Arn. indigenous
 Dichrostachys cinerea (L.) Wight & Arn. subsp. africana Brenan & Brummitt var. africana,   indigenous
 Dichrostachys cinerea (L.) Wight & Arn. subsp. africana Brenan & Brummitt var. pubescens,   indigenous
 Dichrostachys cinerea (L.) Wight & Arn. subsp. africana Brenan & Brummitt var. setulosa,   indigenous
 Dichrostachys cinerea (L.) Wight & Arn. subsp. nyassana (Taub.) Brenan, indigenous

Dipogon
Genus Dipogon:
 Dipogon lignosus (L.) Verdc. indigenous

Dolicholus
Genus Dolicholus:
 Dolicholus totta (Thunb.) Kunze, accepted as Rhynchosia totta (Thunb.) DC. var. totta,   indigenous
 Dolicholus venulosus Hiern, accepted as Rhynchosia totta (Thunb.) DC. var. venulosa (Hiern) Verdc. indigenous

Dolichos
Genus Dolichos:
 Dolichos angustifolius Eckl. & Zeyh. indigenous
 Dolichos angustissimus E.Mey. indigenous
 Dolichos decumbens Thunb. endemic
 Dolichos ensiformis L. accepted as Canavalia ensiformis (L.) DC. indigenous
 Dolichos falciformis E.Mey. indigenous
 Dolichos gladiatus Jacq. accepted as Canavalia gladiata (Jacq.) DC. not indigenous
 Dolichos hastaeformis E.Mey. endemic
 Dolichos junodii (Harms) Verdc. accepted as Nesphostylis junodii (Harms) Munyeny. & F.A.Bisby, indigenous
 Dolichos linearis E.Mey. indigenous
 Dolichos maritimus Aubl. accepted as Canavalia rosea (Sw.) DC.
 Dolichos obtusifolius Lam. accepted as Canavalia rosea (Sw.) DC.
 Dolichos peglerae L.Bolus, endemic
 Dolichos pratensis (E.Mey.) Taub. indigenous
 Dolichos roseus Sw. accepted as Canavalia rosea (Sw.) DC. indigenous
 Dolichos sericeus E.Mey. indigenous
 Dolichos sericeus E.Mey. subsp. sericeus,   indigenous
 Dolichos trilobus L. indigenous
 Dolichos trilobus L. subsp. transvaalicus Verdc. indigenous
 Dolichos trilobus L. subsp. trilobus var. trilobus,   indigenous
 Dolichos virosus Roxb. accepted as Canavalia africana Dunn

Dumasia
Genus Dumasia:
 Dumasia villosa DC. indigenous
 Dumasia villosa DC. var. villosa,   indigenous

Elephantorrhiza
Genus Elephantorrhiza:
 Elephantorrhiza burkei Benth. indigenous
 Elephantorrhiza elephantina (Burch.) Skeels, indigenous
 Elephantorrhiza goetzei (Harms) Harms, indigenous
 Elephantorrhiza goetzei (Harms) Harms subsp. goetzei, indigenous
 Elephantorrhiza obliqua Burtt Davy, indigenous
 Elephantorrhiza obliqua Burtt Davy var. glabra E.Phillips, endemic
 Elephantorrhiza obliqua Burtt Davy var. obliqua, endemic
 Elephantorrhiza praetermissa J.H.Ross, endemic
 Elephantorrhiza woodii E.Phillips, indigenous
 Elephantorrhiza woodii E.Phillips var. pubescens E.Phillips, indigenous
 Elephantorrhiza woodii E.Phillips var. woodii, endemic

Entada
Genus Entada:
 Entada natalensis Benth. indigenous
 Entada rheedei Spreng. indigenous
 Entada wahlbergii Harv. indigenous

Enterolobium
Genus Enterolobium:
 Enterolobium contortisiliquum (Vell.) Morong, not indigenous, cultivated, naturalised

Eriosema
Genus Eriosema:
 Eriosema acuminatum (Eckl. & Zeyh.) C.H.Stirt. endemic
 Eriosema angustifolium Burtt Davy, endemic
 Eriosema buchananii Baker f. indigenous
 Eriosema buchananii Baker f. var. buchananii,   endemic
 Eriosema burkei Benth. ex Harv. indigenous
 Eriosema burkei Benth. ex Harv. var. burkei,   indigenous
 Eriosema cordatum E.Mey. indigenous
 Eriosema distinctum N.E.Br. endemic
 Eriosema dregei E.Mey. endemic
 Eriosema durnfordensis C.H.Stirt. endemic
 Eriosema ellipticifolium Schinz, indigenous
 Eriosema fasciculatum Schinz, endemic
 Eriosema gunniae C.H.Stirt. endemic
 Eriosema kraussianum Meisn. indigenous
 Eriosema latifolium (Benth. ex Harv.) C.H.Stirt. endemic
 Eriosema lucipetum C.H.Stirt. indigenous
 Eriosema luteopetalum C.H.Stirt. endemic
 Eriosema naviculare C.H.Stirt. endemic
 Eriosema nutans Schinz, indigenous
 Eriosema parviflorum E.Mey. indigenous
 Eriosema parviflorum E.Mey. subsp. parviflorum,   indigenous
 Eriosema pauciflorum Klotzsch, indigenous
 Eriosema pauciflorum Klotzsch var. pauciflorum,   indigenous
 Eriosema polystachyium E.Mey. accepted as Eriosema psoraleoides (Lam.) G.Don, present
 Eriosema populifolium Benth. ex Harv. indigenous
 Eriosema populifolium Benth. ex Harv. subsp. capensis C.H.Stirt. & Gordon-Gray, endemic
 Eriosema populifolium Benth. ex Harv. subsp. populifolium,   endemic
 Eriosema preptum C.H.Stirt. endemic
 Eriosema psoraleoides (Lam.) G.Don, indigenous
 Eriosema rossii C.H.Stirt. endemic
 Eriosema salignum E.Mey. indigenous
 Eriosema simulans C.H.Stirt. indigenous
 Eriosema squarrosum (Thunb.) Walp. indigenous
 Eriosema streyi C.H.Stirt. endemic
 Eriosema superpositum C.H.Stirt. endemic
 Eriosema transvaalense C.H.Stirt. indigenous
 Eriosema umtamvunense C.H.Stirt. endemic
 Eriosema x provectum C.H.Stirt. endemic
 Eriosema x woodii  C.H.Stirt. endemic
 Eriosema zuluense C.H.Stirt. endemic

Erythrina
Genus  Erythrina:
 Erythrina acanthocarpa E.Mey. endemic
 Erythrina caffra Thunb. indigenous
 Erythrina crista-gall L. not indigenous, naturalised
 Erythrina humeana Spreng. indigenous
 Erythrina latissima E.Mey. indigenous
 Erythrina lysistemon Hutch. indigenous
 Erythrina x coddii Barneby & Krukoff, endemic
 Erythrina x dyeri Hennessy, indigenous
 Erythrina x hennessyae Barneby & Krukoff, endemic
 Erythrina x johnsoniae Hennessy, endemic
 Erythrina zeyheri Harv. indigenous

Erythrophleum
Genus Erythrophleum:
 Erythrophleum lasianthum Corbishley, indigenous

Faidherbia
Genus Faidherbia:
 Faidherbia albida (Delile) A.Chev. indigenous

Flemingia
Genus Flemingia:
 Flemingia grahamiana Wight & Arn. indigenous

Galactia
Genus Galactia:
 Galactia striata (Jacq.) Urb. indigenous
 Galactia striata (Jacq.) Urb. var. villosa (Wight & Arn.) Verdc. indigenous
 Galactia tenuiflora (Willd.) Wight & Arn. indigenous
 Galactia tenuiflora (Willd.) Wight & Arn. var. villosa (Wight & Arn.) Benth. accepted as Galactia striata (Jacq.) Urb. var. villosa (Wight & Arn.) Verdc. indigenous
 Galactia villosa Wight & Arn. accepted as Galactia striata (Jacq.) Urb. var. villosa (Wight & Arn.) Verdc.

Galega
Genus Galega:
 Galega pinnata Thunb. accepted as Rhynchosia ferulifolia (C.Presl) Benth. ex Harv. indigenous

Genista
Genus Genista:
 Genista monspessulana (L.) L.A.S.Johnson, not indigenous, naturalised, invasive

Gleditsia
Genus Gleditsia:
 Gleditsia triacanthos L. not indigenous, naturalised, invasive

Glycine
Genus Glycine:
 Glycine totta Thunb. accepted as Rhynchosia totta (Thunb.) DC. var. totta, indigenous

Glycyrrhiza
Genus Glycyrrhiza:
 Glycyrrhiza glabra L. not indigenous, naturalised

Guibourtia
Genus Guibourtia:
 Guibourtia conjugata (Bolle) J.Leonard, indigenous

Guilandina
Genus Guilandina:
 Guilandina bonduc L. indigenous

Hoffmannseggia
Genus Hoffmannseggia:
 Hoffmannseggia burchellii (DC.) Benth. ex Oliv. subsp. burchellii,   accepted as Pomaria burchellii (DC.) B.B.Simpson & G.P.Lewis subsp. burchellii,   indigenous
 Hoffmannseggia burchellii (DC.) Benth. ex Oliv. subsp. rubro-violacea (Baker f.) Brummitt & J.H.Ross, accepted as Pomaria burchellii (DC.) B.B.Simpson & G.P.Lewis subsp. rubro-violacea (Baker f.) Brummitt, indigenous
 Hoffmannseggia lactea (Schinz) Schinz, accepted as Pomaria lactea (Schinz) B.B.Simpson & G.P.Lewis, indigenous
 Hoffmannseggia sandersonii (Harv.) Engl. accepted as Pomaria sandersonii (Harv.) B.B.Simpson & G.P.Lewis, indigenous

Hypocalyptus
Genus Hypocalyptus:
 Hypocalyptus coluteoides (Lam.) R.Dahlgren, endemic
 Hypocalyptus oxalidifolius (Sims) Baill. endemic
 Hypocalyptus sophoroides (P.J.Bergius) Baill. endemic

Indigastrum
Genus Indigastrum:
 Indigastrum argyraeum (Eckl. & Zeyh.) Schrire, indigenousastrum niveum (Willd. ex Spreng.) Schrire & Callm. indigenous
 Indigastrum argyroides (E.Mey.) Schrire, indigenous
 Indigastrum burkeanum (Benth. ex Harv.) Schrire, indigenous
 Indigastrum candidissimum (Dinter) Schrire, indigenous
 Indigastrum costatum (Guill. & Perr.) Schrire, indigenous
 Indigastrum costatum (Guill. & Perr.) Schrire subsp. macrum (E.Mey.) Schrire, indigenous
 Indigastrum costatum (Guill. & Perr.) Schrire subsp. theuschii (O.Hoffm.) Schrire, indigenous
 Indigastrum fastigiatum (E.Mey.) Schrire, indigenous
 Indigastrum niveum (Willd. ex Spreng.) Schrire & Callm. indigenous
 Indigastrum parviflorum (B.Heyne ex Wight & Arn.) Schrire, indigenous
 Indigastrum parviflorum (B.Heyne ex Wight & Arn.) Schrire subsp. parviflorum var. parviflorum,   indigenous

Indigofera
Genus Indigofera:
 Indigofera adenoides Baker f. indigenous
 Indigofera alopecuroides (Burm.f.) DC. indigenous
 Indigofera alopecuroides (Burm.f.) DC. var. alopecuroides, endemic
 Indigofera alopecuroides (Burm.f.) DC. var. minor E.Mey. endemic
 Indigofera alpina Eckl. & Zeyh. endemic
 Indigofera alternans DC. indigenous
 Indigofera alternans DC. var. alternans, indigenous
 Indigofera amitina N.E.Br. indigenous
 Indigofera amoena Aiton, endemic
 Indigofera angustata E.Mey. endemic
 Indigofera angustifolia L., indigenous
 Indigofera angustifolia L. var. angustifolia, endemic
 Indigofera angustifolia L. var. tenuifolia (Lam.) Harv. endemic
 Indigofera annua Milne-Redh. accepted as Microcharis annua (Milne-Redh.) Schrire
 Indigofera aquae-nitentis Bremek. indigenous
 Indigofera argyraea Eckl. & Zeyh. accepted as Indigastrum niveum (Willd. ex Spreng.) Schrire & Callm. indigenous
 Indigofera arrecta Hochst. ex A.Rich., indigenous
 Indigofera asantasanensis Schrire & V.R.Clark, endemic
 Indigofera astragalina DC. indigenous
 Indigofera atrata N.E.Br. indigenous
 Indigofera auricoma E.Mey. indigenous
 Indigofera bainesii Baker, indigenous
 Indigofera brachystachya (DC.) E.Mey. endemic
 Indigofera buchananii Burtt Davy, indigenous
 Indigofera burchellii DC. endemic
 Indigofera burchellii E.Mey. accepted as Indigastrum niveum (Willd. ex Spreng.) Schrire & Callm. indigenous
 Indigofera burchellii E.Mey. var. multifolia E.Mey. accepted as Indigastrum niveum (Willd. ex Spreng.) Schrire & Callm. 
 Indigofera burchellii E.Mey. var. paucifolia E.Mey. accepted asIndigastrum niveum (Willd. ex Spreng.) Schrire & Callm. 
 Indigofera candicans Aiton, endemic
 Indigofera candolleana Meisn. endemic
 Indigofera capillaris Thunb. endemic
 Indigofera charlieriana Schinz, indigenous
 Indigofera charlieriana Schinz subsp. sessilis (Chiov.) Schrire var. scaberrima,   indigenous
 Indigofera charlieriana Schinz subsp. sessilis (Chiov.) Schrire var. sessilis,   indigenous
 Indigofera charlieriana Schinz var. charlieriana, indigenous
 Indigofera charlieriana Schinz var. lata J.B.Gillett, indigenous
 Indigofera charlieriana Schinz var. scaberrima (Schinz) J.B.Gillett, accepted as Indigofera charlieriana Schinz subsp. sessilis (Chiov.) Schrire var. scaberrima, indigenous
 Indigofera circinnata Benth. ex Harv. indigenous
 Indigofera collina Eckl. & Zeyh. accepted as Indigastrum niveum (Willd. ex Spreng.) Schrire & Callm.
 Indigofera colutea (Burm.f.) Merr. indigenous
 Indigofera colutea (Burm.f.) Merr. var. colutea,   indigenous
 Indigofera commixta N.E.Br. endemic
 Indigofera comosa N.E.Br. indigenous
 Indigofera complicata Eckl. & Zeyh. indigenous
 Indigofera concava Harv. endemic
 Indigofera confusa Prain & Baker f. indigenous
 Indigofera crebra N.E.Br. indigenous
 Indigofera cryptantha Benth. ex Harv. indigenous
 Indigofera cryptantha Benth. ex Harv. var. cryptantha,   indigenous
 Indigofera cryptantha Benth. ex Harv. var. occidentalis Baker f. indigenous
 Indigofera cuneifolia Eckl. & Zeyh. indigenous
 Indigofera cuneifolia Eckl. & Zeyh. var. angustifolia Harv. endemic
 Indigofera cuneifolia Eckl. & Zeyh. var. cuneifolia,   indigenous
 Indigofera cytisoides (L.) L. endemic
 Indigofera daleoides Benth. ex Harv. indigenous
 Indigofera daleoides Benth. ex Harv. var. daleoides,   indigenous
 Indigofera daleoides Benth. ex Harv. var. gossweileri Baker f. indigenous
 Indigofera damarana Merxm. & A.Schreib. indigenous
 Indigofera declinata E.Mey. endemic
 Indigofera decora Lindl. not indigenous, naturalised
 Indigofera delagoaensis Baker f. ex J.B.Gillett, indigenous
 Indigofera densa N.E.Br. indigenous
 Indigofera denudata L.f., endemic
 Indigofera depressa Harv. endemic
 Indigofera digitata Thunb. endemic
 Indigofera dillwynioides Benth. ex Harv. endemic
 Indigofera dimidiata Vogel ex Walp. indigenous
 Indigofera disticha Eckl. & Zeyh. endemic
 Indigofera dolichothyrsa Baker f. indigenous
 Indigofera dregeana E.Mey. indigenous
 Indigofera egens N.E.Br. endemic
 Indigofera elandsbergensis Phillipson, endemic
 Indigofera enormis N.E.Br. indigenous
 Indigofera erecta Thunb., endemic
 Indigofera eriocarpa E.Mey. indigenous
 Indigofera evansiana Burtt Davy, indigenous
 Indigofera evansii Schltr. endemic
 Indigofera exigua Eckl. & Zeyh. endemic
 Indigofera filicaulis Eckl. & Zeyh. endemic
 Indigofera filifolia Thunb., endemic
 Indigofera filiformis L.f. endemic
 Indigofera filipes Benth. ex Harv. indigenous
 Indigofera flabellata Harv. endemic
 Indigofera flavicans Baker, indigenous
 Indigofera floribunda N.E.Br. endemic
 Indigofera foliosa E.Mey. endemic
 Indigofera frondosa N.E.Br. indigenous
 Indigofera frutescens L.f. endemic
 Indigofera fulcrata Harv. endemic
 Indigofera galpinii N.E.Br. indigenous
 Indigofera gifbergensis C.H.Stirt. & Jarvie, endemic
 Indigofera glaucescens Eckl. & Zeyh. endemic
 Indigofera glomerata E.Mey. endemic
 Indigofera gracilis Spreng. endemic
 Indigofera grata E.Mey. endemic
 Indigofera grisophylla Fourc. endemic
 Indigofera guthriei Bolus, endemic
 Indigofera hamulosa Schltr. endemic
 Indigofera hantamensis Diels, endemic
 Indigofera hedyantha Eckl. & Zeyh. indigenous
 Indigofera hedyantha Eckl. & Zeyh. subsp. hedyantha,   indigenous
 Indigofera hedyantha Eckl. & Zeyh. subsp. inyangana (N.E.Br.) Schrire, indigenous
 Indigofera hedyantha Eckl. & Zeyh. subsp. robusta Schrire, indigenous
 Indigofera hendecaphylla Jacq. indigenous
 Indigofera heterantha Wall. ex Brandis, not indigenous, naturalised
 Indigofera heterophylla Thunb. endemic
 Indigofera heterotricha DC., indigenous
 Indigofera heterotricha DC. subsp. heterotricha, indigenous
 Indigofera heterotricha DC. subsp. pechuelii (Kuntze) Schrire, indigenous
 Indigofera hilaris Eckl. & Zeyh. indigenous
 Indigofera hilaris Eckl. & Zeyh. var. hilaris,   indigenous
 Indigofera hirsuta L. indigenous
 Indigofera hirsuta L. var. hirsuta, indigenous
 Indigofera hispida Eckl. & Zeyh. endemic
 Indigofera hochstetteri Baker, indigenous
 Indigofera hochstetteri Baker subsp. streyana (Merxm.) A.Schreib. indigenous
 Indigofera hololeuca Benth. ex Harv. indigenous
 Indigofera holubii N.E.Br. indigenous
 Indigofera homblei Baker f. & Martin, indigenous
 Indigofera homblei Baker f. & Martin subsp. homblei, indigenous
 Indigofera humifusa Eckl. & Zeyh. endemic
 Indigofera hybrida N.E.Br. endemic
 Indigofera incana Thunb. endemic
 Indigofera ingrata N.E.Br. indigenous
 Indigofera inhambanensis Klotzsch, indigenous
 Indigofera inyangana N.E.Br. accepted as Indigofera hedyantha Eckl. & Zeyh. subsp. inyangana (N.E.Br.) Schrire, endemic
 Indigofera ionii Jarvie & C.H.Stirt. endemic
 Indigofera jucunda Schrire, endemic
 Indigofera krookii Schltr. ex Zahlbr. endemic
 Indigofera langebergensis L.Bolus, endemic
 Indigofera laxeracemosa Baker f. indigenous
 Indigofera leendertziae N.E.Br. endemic
 Indigofera lepida N.E.Br. endemic
 Indigofera leptocarpa Eckl. & Zeyh. endemic
 Indigofera limosa L.Bolus, endemic
 Indigofera longebarbata Engl. accepted as Indigofera longibarbata Engl. present
 Indigofera longibarbata Engl. indigenous
 Indigofera lupatana Baker f. indigenous
 Indigofera lyallii Baker, indigenous
 Indigofera lyallii Baker subsp. lyallii,   indigenous
 Indigofera lydenbergensis N.E.Br. indigenous
 Indigofera lydenburgensis N.E.Br. indigenous
 Indigofera magnifica Schrire & V.R.Clark, endemic
 Indigofera maritima Baker, indigenous
 Indigofera masonae N.E.Br. endemic
 Indigofera mauritanica (L.) Thunb. endemic
 Indigofera mauritanica (L.) Thunb. var. hirta Harv. accepted as Indigofera candolleana Meisn. present
 Indigofera melanadenia Benth. ex Harv. indigenous
 Indigofera meyeriana Eckl. & Zeyh. endemic
 Indigofera micrantha E.Mey. indigenous
 Indigofera mimosoides Baker, indigenous
 Indigofera mimosoides Baker var. mimosoides,   indigenous
 Indigofera mischocarpa Schltr. endemic
 Indigofera mollicoma N.E.Br. indigenous
 Indigofera mollis Eckl. & Zeyh., endemic
 Indigofera monostachya Eckl. & Zeyh. endemic
 Indigofera mundiana Eckl. & Zeyh. endemic
 Indigofera natalensis Bolus, endemic
 Indigofera nebrowniana J.B.Gillett, indigenous
 Indigofera neglecta N.E.Br. indigenous
 Indigofera nigromontana Eckl. & Zeyh. indigenous
 Indigofera nivea Willd. ex Spreng. accepted as Indigastrum niveum (Willd. ex Spreng.) Schrire & Callm. indigenous
 Indigofera nudicaulis E.Mey. indigenous
 Indigofera obcordata Eckl. & Zeyh. endemic
 Indigofera obscura N.E.Br. indigenous
 Indigofera ormocarpoides Baker, indigenous
 Indigofera ovata Thunb. endemic
 Indigofera ovina Harv. endemic
 Indigofera oxalidea Welw. ex Baker, indigenous
 Indigofera oxytropis Benth. ex Harv. indigenous
 Indigofera pappei Fourc. endemic
 Indigofera pauciflora Eckl. & Zeyh., indigenous
 Indigofera pechuelii Kuntze, accepted as Indigofera heterotricha DC. subsp. pechuelii (Kuntze) Schrire, indigenous
 Indigofera placida N.E.Br. indigenous
 Indigofera platypoda E.Mey. endemic
 Indigofera podophylla Benth. ex Harv. indigenous
 Indigofera poliotes Eckl. & Zeyh. endemic
 Indigofera pongolana N.E.Br. endemic
 Indigofera porrecta Eckl. & Zeyh. indigenous
 Indigofera porrecta Eckl. & Zeyh. var. bicolor Harv. endemic
 Indigofera porrecta Eckl. & Zeyh. var. porrecta, indigenous
 Indigofera praticola Baker f. indigenous
 Indigofera procumbens L., endemic
 Indigofera pseudoevansii Hilliard & B.L.Burtt, endemic
 Indigofera psoraloides (L.) L. endemic
 Indigofera pungens E.Mey. indigenous
 Indigofera quinquefolia E.Mey. endemic
 Indigofera racemosa L. indigenous
 Indigofera reducta N.E.Br. indigenous
 Indigofera rehmannii Baker f. endemic
 Indigofera rhodantha Fourc. indigenous
 Indigofera rhytidocarpa Benth. ex Harv. indigenous
 Indigofera rhytidocarpa Benth. ex Harv. subsp. rhytidocarpa, indigenous
 Indigofera ripae N.E.Br. endemic
 Indigofera rostrata Bolus, indigenous
 Indigofera rostrata Bolus subsp. rostrata, indigenous
 Indigofera rubroglandulosa Germish. endemic
 Indigofera sanguinea N.E.Br. indigenous
 Indigofera sarmentosa L.f. endemic
 Indigofera schimperi Jaub. & Spach, indigenous
 Indigofera schimperi Jaub. & Spach var. baukeana (Vatke) J.B.Gillett, indigenous
 Indigofera schimperi Jaub. & Spach var. schimperi, indigenous
 Indigofera schinzii N.E.Br. indigenous
 Indigofera sessilifolia DC. indigenous
 Indigofera setiflora Baker, indigenous
 Indigofera setosa N.E.Br. endemic
 Indigofera sordida Benth. ex Harv. indigenous
 Indigofera soutpansbergensis Schrire, indigenous
 Indigofera spicata Forssk. indigenous
 Indigofera spicata Forssk. var. spicata, indigenous
 Indigofera stricta L.f. endemic
 Indigofera subcorymbosa Baker, indigenous
 Indigofera subcorymbosa Baker var. eylesii Baker f. accepted as Indigofera subcorymbosa Baker var. subcorymbosa, present
 Indigofera subcorymbosa Baker var. subcorymbosa, endemic
 Indigofera subulata Vahl ex Poir. var. scabra (Roth) Meikle, indigenous
 Indigofera subulata Vahl ex Poir. var. subulata, indigenous
 Indigofera sulcata DC. endemic
 Indigofera superba C.H.Stirt. endemic
 Indigofera swaziensis Bolus, indigenous
 Indigofera swaziensis Bolus var. perplexa (N.E.Br.) J.B.Gillett, indigenous
 Indigofera swaziensis Bolus var. swaziensis,   indigenous
 Indigofera tenuissima E.Mey. indigenous
 Indigofera thesioides Jarvie & C.H.Stirt. endemic
 Indigofera tinctoria L. indigenous
 Indigofera tinctoria L. var. arcuata J.B.Gillett, indigenous
 Indigofera tomentosa Eckl. & Zeyh. endemic
 Indigofera torulosa E.Mey., indigenous
 Indigofera torulosa E.Mey. var. angustiloba (Baker f.) J.B.Gillett, endemic
 Indigofera torulosa E.Mey. var. torulosa, indigenous
 Indigofera trifolioides Baker f. endemic
 Indigofera triquetra E.Mey. endemic
 Indigofera tristis E.Mey. indigenous
 Indigofera tristoides N.E.Br. indigenous
 Indigofera trita L.f. indigenous
 Indigofera trita L.f. subsp. scabra (Roth) de Kort & G.Thijsse, accepted as Indigofera subulata Vahl ex Poir. var. scabra (Roth) Meikle, indigenous
 Indigofera trita L.f. subsp. subulata (Vahl ex Poir.) Ali, accepted as Indigofera subulata Vahl ex Poir. indigenous
 Indigofera trita L.f. var. scabra (Roth) Ali, accepted as Indigofera subulata Vahl ex Poir. var. scabra (Roth) Meikle, present
 Indigofera trita L.f. var. subulata (Vahl ex Poir.) Ali, accepted as Indigofera subulata Vahl ex Poir. present
 Indigofera velutina E.Mey. indigenous
 Indigofera venusta Eckl. & Zeyh. endemic
 Indigofera verrucosa Eckl. & Zeyh. endemic
 Indigofera vicioides Jaub. & Spach, indigenous
 Indigofera vicioides Jaub. & Spach var. rogersii (R.E.Fr.) J.B.Gillett, indigenous
 Indigofera vicioides Jaub. & Spach var. vicioides, indigenous
 Indigofera williamsonii (Harv.) N.E.Br. indigenous
 Indigofera woodii Bolus, indigenous
 Indigofera woodii Bolus var. laxa Bolus, endemic
 Indigofera woodii Bolus var. woodii,   endemic
 Indigofera zeyheri Spreng. ex Eckl. & Zeyh. indigenous

Kotschya
Genus Kotschya:
 Kotschya parvifolia (Burtt Davy) Verdc. indigenous
 Kotschya thymodora (Baker f.) Wild subsp. thymodora,   indigenous

Lablab
Genus Lablab:
 Lablab purpureus (L.) Sweet, indigenous
 Lablab purpureus (L.) Sweet subsp. purpureus, not indigenous, naturalised
 Lablab purpureus (L.) Sweet subsp. uncinatus Verdc. indigenous

Lathyrus
Genus Lathyrus:
 Lathyrus latifolius L. not indigenous, cultivated, naturalised, invasive

Lebeckia
Genus Lebeckia:
 Lebeckia acanthoclada Dinter, accepted as Calobota acanthoclada (Dinter) Boatwr. & B.-E.van Wyk, indigenous
 Lebeckia ambigua E.Mey. endemic
 Lebeckia bowieana Benth. accepted as Wiborgiella bowieana (Benth.) Boatwr. & B.-E.van Wyk, endemic
 Lebeckia brevicarpa M.M.le Roux & B.-E.van Wyk, endemic
 Lebeckia brevipes M.M.le Roux & B.-E.van Wyk, endemic
 Lebeckia carnosa (E.Mey.) Druce, accepted as Lebeckia contaminata (L.) Thunb., endemic
 Lebeckia cinerea E.Mey. accepted as Calobota cinerea (E.Mey.) Boatwr. & B.-E.van Wyk, indigenous
 Lebeckia contaminata (L.) Thunb., endemic
 Lebeckia cytisoides (Berg.) Thunb. accepted as Calobota cytisoides (Berg.) Eckl. & Zeyh. endemic
 Lebeckia dinteri Harms, accepted as Calobota linearifolia (E.Mey.) Boatwr. & B.-E.van Wyk
 Lebeckia fasciculata Benth. accepted as Wiborgiella fasciculata (Benth.) Boatwr. & B.-E.van Wyk, endemic
 Lebeckia gracilis Eckl. & Zeyh. endemic
 Lebeckia grandiflora Benth. endemic
 Lebeckia halenbergensis Merxm. & A.Schreib. accepted as Calobota halenbergensis (Merxm. & Schreib.) Boatwr. & B.-E.van Wyk, present
 Lebeckia inflata Bolus, accepted as Wiborgiella inflata (Bolus) Boatwr. & B.-E.van Wyk, endemic
 Lebeckia leipoldtiana Schltr. ex R.Dahlgren, accepted as Wiborgiella leipoldtiana (Schltr. ex R.Dahlgren) Boatwr. & B.-E.van Wyk, endemic
 Lebeckia leptophylla Benth. accepted as Wiborgiella mucronata (Benth.) Boatwr. & B.-E.van Wyk, endemic
 Lebeckia linearifolia E.Mey. accepted as Calobota linearifolia (E.Mey.) Boatwr. & B.-E.van Wyk, indigenous
 Lebeckia longipes Bolus, endemic
 Lebeckia lotononoides Schltr. accepted as Calobota lotononoides (Schltr.) Boatwr. & B.-E.van Wyk, endemic
 Lebeckia macowanii T.M.Salter, accepted as Lebeckia meyeriana Eckl. & Zeyh. endemic
 Lebeckia macrantha Harv. accepted as Calobota cuspidosa (Burch.) Boatwr. & B.-E.van Wyk, indigenous
 Lebeckia melilotoides R.Dahlgren, accepted as Calobota elongata (Thunb.) Boatwr. & B.-E.van Wyk, endemic
 Lebeckia meyeriana Eckl. & Zeyh. endemic
 Lebeckia microphylla E.Mey. accepted as Lotononis caerulescens (E.Mey.) B.-E.van Wyk, present
 Lebeckia mucronata Benth. accepted as Wiborgiella mucronata (Benth.) Boatwr. & B.-E.van Wyk, endemic
 Lebeckia multiflora E.Mey. accepted as Calobota angustifolia (E.Mey.) Boatwr. & B.-E.van Wyk, indigenous
 Lebeckia obovata Schinz, accepted as Calobota obovata (Schinz) Boatwr. & B.-E.van Wyk
 Lebeckia parvifolia (Schinz) Harms, accepted as Calobota angustifolia (E.Mey.) Boatwr. & B.-E.van Wyk, present
 Lebeckia pauciflora Eckl. & Zeyh. endemic
 Lebeckia plukenetiana E.Mey. endemic
 Lebeckia psiloloba (E.Mey.) Walp. accepted as Calobota psiloloba (E.Mey.) Boatwr. & B.-E.van Wyk, endemic
 Lebeckia pungens Thunb. accepted as Calobota pungens (Thunb.) Boatwr. & B.-E.van Wyk, present
 Lebeckia sepiaria (L.) Thunb., endemic
 Lebeckia sericea Thunb. accepted as Calobota sericea (Thunb.) Boatwr. & B.-E.van Wyk, endemic
 Lebeckia sessilifolia (Eckl. & Zeyh.) Benth. accepted as Wiborgiella sessilifolia (Eckl. & Zeyh.) Boatwr. & B.-E.van Wyk, endemic
 Lebeckia simsiana Eckl. & Zeyh. accepted as Lebeckia sepiaria (L.) Thunb., endemic
 Lebeckia spinescens Harv. accepted as Calobota spinescens (Harv.) Boatwr. & B.-E.van Wyk, indigenous
 Lebeckia uniflora B.-E.van Wyk & M.M.le Roux, endemic
 Lebeckia wrightii (Harv.) Bolus, endemic
 Lebeckia zeyheri M.M.le Roux & B.-E.van Wyk, endemic

Leobordea
Genus  Leobordea:
 Leobordea acuticarpa (B.-E.van Wyk) B.-E.van Wyk & Boatwr. endemic
 Leobordea adpressa (N.E.Br.) B.-E.van Wyk & Boatwr. accepted as Leobordea acuticarpa (B.-E.van Wyk) B.-E.van Wyk & Boatwr. indigenous
 Leobordea adpressa (N.E.Br.) B.-E.van Wyk & Boatwr. subsp. adpressa,   indigenous
 Leobordea adpressa (N.E.Br.) B.-E.van Wyk & Boatwr. subsp. leptantha (B.-E.van Wyk) B.-E.van Wyk, endemic
 Leobordea anthylloides (Harv.) B.-E.van Wyk & Boatwr. accepted as Leobordea sutherlandii (Dummer) B.-E.van Wyk & Boatwr. present
 Leobordea arida (Dummer) B.-E.van Wyk & Boatwr. endemic
 Leobordea benthamiana (Dummer) B.-E.van Wyk & Boatwr. endemic
 Leobordea carinata (E.Mey.) B.-E.van Wyk & Boatwr. indigenous
 Leobordea corymbosa (E.Mey.) B.-E.van Wyk & Boatwr. indigenous
 Leobordea decumbens (Thunb.) B.-E.van Wyk & Boatwr. indigenous
 Leobordea decumbens (Thunb.) B.-E.van Wyk & Boatwr. subsp. decumbens,   endemic
 Leobordea decumbens (Thunb.) B.-E.van Wyk & Boatwr. subsp. rehmannii (Dummer) B.-E.van Wyk, indigenous
 Leobordea difformis (B.-E.van Wyk) B.-E.van Wyk & Boatwr. endemic
 Leobordea diffusa B.-E.van Wyk & Boatwr. accepted as Leobordea rosea (Dummer) L.A.Silva & J.Freitas, endemic
 Leobordea digitata (Harv.) B.-E.van Wyk & Boatwr. endemic
 Leobordea divaricata Eckl. & Zeyh. indigenous
 Leobordea eriantha (Benth.) B.-E.van Wyk & Boatwr. indigenous
 Leobordea esterhuyseana (B.-E.van Wyk) B.-E.van Wyk & Boatwr. endemic
 Leobordea foliosa (Bolus) B.-E.van Wyk & Boatwr. indigenous
 Leobordea furcata (Merxm. & A.Schreib.) B.-E.van Wyk & Boatwr., accepted as Leobordea furcata (Merxm. & A.Schreib.) L.A.Silva & J.Freitas, indigenous
 Leobordea furcata (Merxm. & A.Schreib.) L.A.Silva & J.Freitas, indigenous
 Leobordea globulosa (B.-E.van Wyk) B.-E.van Wyk & Boatwr. endemic
 Leobordea grandis (Dummer) B.-E.van Wyk & Boatwr. endemic
 Leobordea hirsuta (Schinz) B.-E.van Wyk & Boatwr. endemic
 Leobordea lanata (Thunb.) B.-E.van Wyk & Boatwr. endemic
 Leobordea lanceolata (E.Mey.) B.-E.van Wyk & Boatwr. indigenous
 Leobordea laticeps (B.-E.van Wyk) B.-E.van Wyk & Boatwr. endemic
 Leobordea longicephala (B.-E.van Wyk) B.-E.van Wyk & Boatwr. endemic
 Leobordea longiflora (Bolus) B.-E.van Wyk & Boatwr. endemic
 Leobordea magnifica (B.-E.van Wyk) B.-E.van Wyk & Boatwr. endemic
 Leobordea mollis (E.Mey.) B.-E.van Wyk & Boatwr. endemic
 Leobordea mucronata (Conrath) B.-E.van Wyk & Boatwr. indigenous
 Leobordea oligocephala (B.-E.van Wyk) B.-E.van Wyk & Boatwr. endemic
 Leobordea pariflora (N.E.Br.) B.-E.van Wyk & Boatwr. endemic
 Leobordea pentaphylla (E.Mey.) B.-E.van Wyk & Boatwr. endemic
 Leobordea platycarpa (Viv.) B.-E.van Wyk & Boatwr. indigenous
 Leobordea plicata (B.-E.van Wyk) B.-E.van Wyk & Boatwr. endemic
 Leobordea polycephala (E.Mey.) B.-E.van Wyk & Boatwr. endemic
 Leobordea procumbens (Bolus) B.-E.van Wyk & Boatwr. indigenous
 Leobordea prolifera (E.Mey.) Eckl. & Zeyh. endemic
 Leobordea pulchra (Dummer) B.-E.van Wyk & Boatwr. indigenous
 Leobordea pusilla (Dummer) B.-E.van Wyk & Boatwr. endemic
 Leobordea quinata (E.Mey.) B.-E.van Wyk & Boatwr. endemic
 Leobordea rosea (Dummer) L.A.Silva & J.Freitas, endemic
 Leobordea stipulosa (Baker f.) B.-E.van Wyk & Boatwr. indigenous
 Leobordea sutherlandii (Dummer) B.-E.van Wyk & Boatwr. endemic

Lespedeza
Genus Lespedeza:
 Lespedeza cuneata (Dum.Cours.) G.Don, not indigenous, naturalised

Lessertia
Genus Lessertia:
 Lessertia affinis Burtt Davy, endemic
 Lessertia amajubica T.Nkonki, endemic
 Lessertia annularis Burch. indigenous
 Lessertia argentea Harv. endemic
 Lessertia benguellensis Baker f. indigenous
 Lessertia brachypus Harv. indigenous
 Lessertia brachystachya DC. indigenous
 Lessertia candida E.Mey. indigenous
 Lessertia canescens Goldblatt & J.C.Manning, endemic
 Lessertia capensis (P.J.Bergius) Druce, endemic
 Lessertia capitata E.Mey. indigenous
 Lessertia carnosa Eckl. & Zeyh. endemic
 Lessertia contracta M.Balkwill, endemic
 Lessertia depressa Harv. indigenous
 Lessertia diffusa R.Br. indigenous
 Lessertia dykei L.Bolus, endemic
 Lessertia excisa DC. endemic
 Lessertia falciformis DC. indigenous
 Lessertia flanaganii L.Bolus, endemic
 Lessertia flexuosa E.Mey. endemic
 Lessertia frutescens (L.) Goldblatt & J.C.Manning, indigenous
 Lessertia frutescens (L.) Goldblatt & J.C.Manning subsp. frutescens,   indigenous
 Lessertia frutescens (L.) Goldblatt & J.C.Manning subsp. microphylla (Burch. ex DC.) J.C.Manning & B, indigenous
 Lessertia frutescens (L.) Goldblatt & J.C.Manning subsp. speciosa (E.Phillips & R.A.Dyer) J.C.Mannin, endemic
 Lessertia fruticosa Lindl. endemic
 Lessertia globosa L.Bolus, endemic
 Lessertia harveyana L.Bolus, endemic
 Lessertia herbacea (L.) Druce, indigenous
 Lessertia humilis (E.Phillips & R.A.Dyer) Goldblatt & J.C.Manning, accepted as Lessertia frutescens (L.) Goldblatt & J.C.Manning subsp. frutescens,   endemic
 Lessertia incana Schinz, indigenous
 Lessertia inflata Harv. endemic
 Lessertia ingeliensis M.Balkwill, endemic
 Lessertia kensitii L.Bolus, endemic
 Lessertia lanata Harv. endemic
 Lessertia macroflora M.Balkwill, indigenous
 Lessertia macrostachya DC. indigenous
 Lessertia macrostachya DC. var. macrostachya,   indigenous
 Lessertia margaritacea E.Mey. endemic
 Lessertia meyeri Boatwr. T.Nkonki & B.-E.van Wyk, indigenous
 Lessertia microcarpa E.Mey. endemic
 Lessertia microphylla (Burch. ex DC.) Goldblatt & J.C.Manning, accepted as Lessertia frutescens (L.) Goldblatt & J.C.Manning subsp. microphylla (Burch. ex DC.) J.C.Manning & B, indigenous
 Lessertia miniata T.M.Salter, endemic
 Lessertia montana (E.Phillips & R.A.Dyer) Goldblatt & J.C.Manning, accepted as Lessertia frutescens (L.) Goldblatt & J.C.Manning subsp. frutescens,   indigenous
 Lessertia mossii R.G.N.Young, endemic
 Lessertia muricata T.M.Salter, endemic
 Lessertia pappeana Harv. endemic
 Lessertia parviflora Harv. endemic
 Lessertia pauciflora Harv. indigenous
 Lessertia pauciflora Harv. var. pauciflora,   indigenous
 Lessertia pauciflora Harv. var. schlechteri L.Bolus, indigenous
 Lessertia perennans (Jacq.) DC. indigenous
 Lessertia perennans (Jacq.) DC. var. perennans,   indigenous
 Lessertia perennans (Jacq.) DC. var. polystachya (Harv.) L.Bolus, indigenous
 Lessertia perennans (Jacq.) DC. var. sericea L.Bolus, endemic
 Lessertia phillipsiana Burtt Davy, endemic
 Lessertia physodes Eckl. & Zeyh. endemic
 Lessertia prostata DC. indigenous
 Lessertia rigida E.Mey. endemic
 Lessertia sneeuwbergensis Germish. endemic
 Lessertia speciosa (E.Phillips & R.A.Dyer) Goldblatt & J.C.Manning, accepted as Lessertia frutescens (L.) Goldblatt & J.C.Manning subsp. speciosa (E.Phillips & R.A.Dyer) J.C.Mannin, endemic
 Lessertia spinescens E.Mey. endemic
 Lessertia stenoloba E.Mey. endemic
 Lessertia stipulata Baker f., indigenous
 Lessertia stricta L.Bolus, indigenous
 Lessertia subumbellata Harv. endemic
 Lessertia tenuifolia E.Mey. endemic
 Lessertia thodei L.Bolus, indigenous
 Lessertia tomentosa DC. endemic

Leucaena
Genus Leucaena:
 Leucaena latisiliqua (L.) Gillis, accepted as Lysiloma latisiliquum (L.) Benth. not indigenous, naturalised
 Leucaena leucocephala (Lam.) de Wit, not indigenous, naturalised, invasive
 Leucaena leucocephala (Lam.) de Wit subsp. leucocephala,   not indigenous, naturalised

Liparia
Genus Liparia:
 Liparia angustifolia (Eckl. & Zeyh.) A.L.Schutte, endemic
 Liparia bonaespei A.L.Schutte, endemic
 Liparia boucheri (E.G.H.Oliv. & Fellingham) A.L.Schutte, endemic
 Liparia calycina (L.Bolus) A.L.Schutte, endemic
 Liparia capitata Thunb. endemic
 Liparia confusa A.L.Schutte, endemic
 Liparia congesta A.L.Schutte, endemic
 Liparia genistoides (Lam.) A.L.Schutte, endemic
 Liparia graminifolia L. endemic
 Liparia hirsuta Thunb. endemic
 Liparia laevigata (L.) Thunb. endemic
 Liparia latifolia (Benth.) A.L.Schutte, endemic
 Liparia myrtifolia Thunb. endemic
 Liparia parva Vogel ex Walp. endemic
 Liparia racemosa A.L.Schutte, endemic
 Liparia rafnioides A.L.Schutte, endemic
 Liparia sphaerica L. accepted as Liparia splendens (Burm.f.) Bos & de Wit subsp. splendens,   present
 Liparia splendens (Burm.f.) Bos & de Wit, indigenous
 Liparia splendens (Burm.f.) Bos & de Wit subsp. comantha (Eckl. & Zeyh.) Bos & de Wit, endemic
 Liparia splendens (Burm.f.) Bos & de Wit subsp. splendens,   endemic
 Liparia striata A.L.Schutte, endemic
 Liparia umbellifera Thunb. endemic
 Liparia vestita Thunb. endemic

Lipozygis
Genus  Lipozygis:
 Lipozygis quinata E.Mey. accepted as Leobordea quinata (E.Mey.) B.-E.van Wyk & Boatwr. indigenous

Listia
Genus Listia:
 Listia bainesii (Baker) B.-E.van Wyk & Boatwr. indigenous
 Listia heterophylla E.Mey. indigenous
 Listia marlothii (Engl.) B.-E.van Wyk & Boatwr. indigenous
 Listia minima (B.-E.van Wyk) B.-E.van Wyk & Boatwr. endemic
 Listia solitudinis (Dummer) B.-E.van Wyk & Boatwr. endemic
 Listia subulata (B.-E.van Wyk) B.-E.van Wyk & Boatwr. endemic

Lonchocarpus
Genus Lonchocarpus:
 Lonchocarpus bussei Harms, accepted as Philenoptera bussei (Harms) Schrire, indigenous
 Lonchocarpus capassa Rolfe, accepted as Philenoptera violacea (Klotzsch) Schrire, indigenous
 Lonchocarpus sutherlandii (Harv.) Dunn, accepted as Philenoptera sutherlandii (Harv.) Schrire, indigenous
 Lonchocarpus violaceus (Klotzsch) Oliv., accepted as Philenoptera violacea (Klotzsch) Schrire, indigenous
 Lonchocarpus zimmermannii Harms, accepted as Craibia zimmermannii (Harms) Dunn

Lotononis
Genus Lotononis:
 Lotononis acocksii B.-E.van Wyk, endemic
 Lotononis acuminata Eckl. & Zeyh. endemic
 Lotononis acuticarpa B.-E.van Wyk, accepted as Leobordea acuticarpa (B.-E.van Wyk) B.-E.van Wyk & Boatwr. endemic
 Lotononis acutiflora Benth. endemic
 Lotononis adpressa N.E.Br. subsp. adpressa,   accepted as Leobordea adpressa (N.E.Br.) B.-E.van Wyk & Boatwr. subsp. adpressa, indigenous
 Lotononis adpressa N.E.Br. subsp. leptantha B.-E.van Wyk, accepted as Leobordea adpressa (N.E.Br.) B.-E.van Wyk & Boatwr. subsp. leptantha (B.-E.van Wyk) B.-E.van Wyk, endemic
 Lotononis affinis Burtt Davy, accepted as Leobordea mucronata (Conrath) B.-E.van Wyk & Boatwr. present
 Lotononis alpina (Eckl. & Zeyh.) B.-E.van Wyk, indigenous
 Lotononis alpina (Eckl. & Zeyh.) B.-E.van Wyk subsp. alpina,   endemic
 Lotononis alpina (Eckl. & Zeyh.) B.-E.van Wyk subsp. multiflora (Eckl. & Zeyh.) B.-E.van Wyk, endemic
 Lotononis amajubica (Burtt Davy) B.-E.van Wyk, endemic
 Lotononis anthyllopsis B.-E.van Wyk, endemic
 Lotononis arenicola Schltr. endemic
 Lotononis argentea Eckl. & Zeyh. endemic
 Lotononis arida Dummer, accepted as Leobordea arida (Dummer) B.-E.van Wyk & Boatwr. endemic
 Lotononis azurea (Eckl. & Zeyh.) Benth. endemic
 Lotononis azureoides B.-E.van Wyk, endemic
 Lotononis bachmanniana Dummer, endemic
 Lotononis bainesii Baker, accepted as Listia bainesii (Baker) B.-E.van Wyk & Boatwr. indigenous
 Lotononis benthamiana Dummer, accepted as Leobordea benthamiana (Dummer) B.-E.van Wyk & Boatwr. endemic
 Lotononis bolusii Dummer, accepted as Leobordea lanata (Thunb.) B.-E.van Wyk & Boatwr. endemic
 Lotononis brachyantha Harms, indigenous
 Lotononis bracteosa B.-E.van Wyk, accepted as Leobordea bracteosa (B.-E.van Wyk) B.-E.van Wyk & Boatwr.
 Lotononis brevicaulis B.-E.van Wyk, endemic
 Lotononis burchellii Benth. endemic
 Lotononis caerulescens (E.Mey.) B.-E.van Wyk, endemic
 Lotononis calycina (E.Mey.) Benth. accepted as Leobordea divaricata Eckl. & Zeyh. indigenous
 Lotononis carinata (E.Mey.) Benth. accepted as Leobordea carinata (E.Mey.) B.-E.van Wyk & Boatwr. present
 Lotononis carnea B.-E.van Wyk, endemic
 Lotononis carnosa (Eckl. & Zeyh.) Benth. indigenous
 Lotononis carnosa (Eckl. & Zeyh.) Benth. subsp. carnosa,   endemic
 Lotononis carnosa (Eckl. & Zeyh.) Benth. subsp. condensata (Harv.) B.-E.van Wyk, endemic
 Lotononis carnosa (Eckl. & Zeyh.) Benth. subsp. latifolia B.-E.van Wyk, endemic
 Lotononis complanata B.-E.van Wyk, endemic
 Lotononis comptonii B.-E.van Wyk, endemic
 Lotononis corymbosa (E.Mey.) Benth. accepted as Leobordea corymbosa (E.Mey.) B.-E.van Wyk & Boatwr. indigenous
 Lotononis crumanina Burch. ex Benth. indigenous
 Lotononis curtii Harms, indigenous
 Lotononis dahlgrenii B.-E.van Wyk, endemic
 Lotononis decumbens (Thunb.) B.-E.van Wyk, indigenous
 Lotononis decumbens (Thunb.) B.-E.van Wyk subsp. decumbens,   endemic
 Lotononis decumbens (Thunb.) B.-E.van Wyk subsp. rehmannii (Dummer) B.-E.van Wyk, indigenous
 Lotononis delicatula Bolus ex De Wild. accepted as Leobordea quinata (E.Mey.) B.-E.van Wyk & Boatwr. indigenous
 Lotononis densa (Thunb.) Harv. indigenous
 Lotononis densa (Thunb.) Harv. subsp. congesta B.-E.van Wyk, endemic
 Lotononis densa (Thunb.) Harv. subsp. densa,   endemic
 Lotononis densa (Thunb.) Harv. subsp. gracilis (E.Mey.) B.-E.van Wyk, endemic
 Lotononis densa (Thunb.) Harv. subsp. leucoclada (Schltr.) B.-E.van Wyk, endemic
 Lotononis dichiloides Sond. endemic
 Lotononis difformis B.-E.van Wyk, accepted as Leobordea difformis (B.-E.van Wyk) B.-E.van Wyk & Boatwr. endemic
 Lotononis digitata Harv. accepted as Leobordea digitata (Harv.) B.-E.van Wyk & Boatwr. endemic
 Lotononis dissitinodis B.-E.van Wyk, endemic
 Lotononis divaricata (Eckl. & Zeyh.) Benth. indigenous
 Lotononis elongata (Thunb.) D.Dietr. endemic
 Lotononis eriantha Benth. accepted as Leobordea eriantha (Benth.) B.-E.van Wyk & Boatwr. indigenous
 Lotononis eriocarpa (E.Mey.) B.-E.van Wyk, indigenous
 Lotononis esterhuyseniana B.-E.van Wyk, accepted as Leobordea esterhuyseana (B.-E.van Wyk) B.-E.van Wyk & Boatwr. endemic
 Lotononis exstipulata L.Bolus, endemic
 Lotononis falcata (E.Mey.) Benth. indigenous
 Lotononis fastigiata (E.Mey.) B.-E.van Wyk, endemic
 Lotononis filiformis B.-E.van Wyk, endemic
 Lotononis foliosa Bolus, accepted as Leobordea foliosa (Bolus) B.-E.van Wyk & Boatwr. indigenous
 Lotononis fruticoides B.-E.van Wyk, endemic
 Lotononis furcata (Merxm. & A.Schreib.) A.Schreib. accepted as Leobordea furcata (Merxm. & A.Schreib.) L.A.Silva & J.Freitas, indigenous
 Lotononis galpinii Dummer, indigenous
 Lotononis glabra (Thunb.) D.Dietr. endemic
 Lotononis glabrescens (Dummer) B.-E.van Wyk, endemic
 Lotononis globulosa B.-E.van Wyk, accepted as Leobordea globulosa (B.-E.van Wyk) B.-E.van Wyk & Boatwr. present
 Lotononis gracilifolia B.-E.van Wyk, endemic
 Lotononis grandis Dummer & Jenn. accepted as Leobordea grandis (Dummer) B.-E.van Wyk & Boatwr. endemic
 Lotononis harveyi B.-E.van Wyk, endemic
 Lotononis hirsuta (Thunb.) D.Dietr., accepted as Euchlora hirsuta (Thunb.) Druce, present
 Lotononis holosericea (E.Mey.) B.-E.van Wyk, endemic
 Lotononis involucrata (P.J.Bergius) Benth. indigenous
 Lotononis involucrata (P.J.Bergius) Benth. subsp. bracteata B.-E.van Wyk, endemic
 Lotononis involucrata (P.J.Bergius) Benth. subsp. digitata B.-E.van Wyk, endemic
 Lotononis involucrata (P.J.Bergius) Benth. subsp. involucrata,   endemic
 Lotononis involucrata (P.J.Bergius) Benth. subsp. peduncularis (E.Mey.) B.-E.van Wyk, endemic
 Lotononis jacottetii (Schinz) B.-E.van Wyk, indigenous
 Lotononis lamprifolia B.-E.van Wyk, endemic
 Lotononis lanceolata (E.Mey.) Benth. accepted as Leobordea lanceolata (E.Mey.) B.-E.van Wyk & Boatwr. indigenous
 Lotononis laticeps B.-E.van Wyk, accepted as Leobordea laticeps (B.-E.van Wyk) B.-E.van Wyk & Boatwr. endemic
 Lotononis laxa Eckl. & Zeyh. indigenous
 Lotononis lenticula (E.Mey.) Benth. endemic
 Lotononis leptoloba Bolus, endemic
 Lotononis linearifolia B.-E.van Wyk, indigenous
 Lotononis listii Polhill, accepted as Listia heterophylla E.Mey. indigenous
 Lotononis longicephala B.-E.van Wyk, accepted as Leobordea longicephala (B.-E.van Wyk) B.-E.van Wyk & Boatwr. endemic
 Lotononis longiflora Bolus, accepted as Leobordea longiflora (Bolus) B.-E.van Wyk & Boatwr. endemic
 Lotononis lotononoides (Scott-Elliot) B.-E.van Wyk, indigenous
 Lotononis macrocarpa Eckl. & Zeyh. accepted as Ezoloba macrocarpa (Eckl. & Zeyh.) B.-E.van Wyk & Boatwr. present
 Lotononis macrosepala Conrath, indigenous
 Lotononis maculata Dummer, indigenous
 Lotononis magnifica B.-E.van Wyk, accepted as Leobordea magnifica (B.-E.van Wyk) B.-E.van Wyk & Boatwr. endemic
 Lotononis magnistipulata Dummer, accepted as Argyrolobium lotoides Harv. present
 Lotononis marlothii Engl. accepted as Listia marlothii (Engl.) B.-E.van Wyk & Boatwr. indigenous
 Lotononis maximiliani Schltr. ex De Wild. endemic
 Lotononis meyeri (C.Presl) B.-E.van Wyk, endemic
 Lotononis micrantha Eckl. & Zeyh. endemic
 Lotononis minima B.-E.van Wyk, accepted as Listia minima (B.-E.van Wyk) B.-E.van Wyk & Boatwr. endemic
 Lotononis minor Dummer & Jenn. indigenous
 Lotononis mirabilis Dinter, accepted as Leobordea mirabilis (Dinter) B.-E.van Wyk & Boatwr.
 Lotononis mollis (E.Mey.) Benth. accepted as Leobordea mollis (E.Mey.) B.-E.van Wyk & Boatwr. endemic
 Lotononis monophylla Harv. endemic
 Lotononis mucronata Conrath, accepted as Leobordea mucronata (Conrath) B.-E.van Wyk & Boatwr. indigenous
 Lotononis nutans B.-E.van Wyk, endemic
 Lotononis oligocephala B.-E.van Wyk, accepted as Leobordea oligocephala (B.-E.van Wyk) B.-E.van Wyk & Boatwr. endemic
 Lotononis oxyptera (E.Mey.) Benth. endemic
 Lotononis pallens (Eckl. & Zeyh.) Benth. endemic
 Lotononis pariflora N.E.Br. accepted as Leobordea pariflora (N.E.Br.) B.-E.van Wyk & Boatwr. endemic
 Lotononis parviflora (P.J.Bergius) D.Dietr. endemic
 Lotononis pentaphylla (E.Mey.) Benth. accepted as Leobordea pentaphylla (E.Mey.) B.-E.van Wyk & Boatwr. endemic
 Lotononis perplexa (E.Mey.) Eckl. & Zeyh. endemic
 Lotononis platycarpa (Viv.) Pic.Serm. accepted as Leobordea platycarpa (Viv.) B.-E.van Wyk & Boatwr. indigenous
 Lotononis platycarpa (Viv.) Pic.Serm. var. abyssinica (Hochst. ex A.Rich.) Pic.Serm. accepted as Leobordea platycarpa (Viv.) B.-E.van Wyk & Boatwr. indigenous
 Lotononis plicata B.-E.van Wyk, accepted as Leobordea plicata (B.-E.van Wyk) B.-E.van Wyk & Boatwr. endemic
 Lotononis polycephala Benth. accepted as Leobordea polycephala (E.Mey.) B.-E.van Wyk & Boatwr. endemic
 Lotononis pottiae Burtt Davy, endemic
 Lotononis procumbens Bolus, accepted as Leobordea procumbens (Bolus) B.-E.van Wyk & Boatwr. indigenous
 Lotononis prolifera (E.Mey.) B.-E.van Wyk, accepted as Leobordea prolifera (E.Mey.) Eckl. & Zeyh. endemic
 Lotononis prostrata (L.) Benth. endemic
 Lotononis pulchella (E.Mey.) B.-E.van Wyk, indigenous
 Lotononis pulchra Dummer, accepted as Leobordea pulchra (Dummer) B.-E.van Wyk & Boatwr. indigenous
 Lotononis pumila Eckl. & Zeyh. endemic
 Lotononis pungens Eckl. & Zeyh. endemic
 Lotononis purpurescens B.-E.van Wyk, endemic
 Lotononis pusilla Dummer, accepted as Leobordea pusilla (Dummer) B.-E.van Wyk & Boatwr. endemic
 Lotononis quinata (E.Mey.) Benth. accepted as Leobordea quinata (E.Mey.) B.-E.van Wyk & Boatwr. endemic
 Lotononis rabenaviana Dinter & Harms, indigenous
 Lotononis racemiflora B.-E.van Wyk, endemic
 Lotononis rigida (E.Mey.) Benth. endemic
 Lotononis rosea Dummer, accepted as Leobordea rosea (Dummer) L.A.Silva & J.Freitas, indigenous
 Lotononis rostrata Benth. indigenous
 Lotononis rostrata Benth. subsp. brachybotrys B.-E.van Wyk, endemic
 Lotononis rostrata Benth. subsp. namaquensis (Bolus) B.-E.van Wyk, endemic
 Lotononis rostrata Benth. subsp. rostrata,   endemic
 Lotononis sabulosa T.M.Salter, endemic
 Lotononis schoenfelderi (Dinter ex Merxm. & A.Schreib.) A.Schreib., accepted as Leobordea schoenfelderi (Dinter ex Merxm. & A.Schreib.) B.-E.van Wyk & Boatwr.
 Lotononis sericophylla Benth. indigenous
 Lotononis solitudinis Dummer, accepted as Listia solitudinis (Dummer) B.-E.van Wyk & Boatwr. endemic
 Lotononis sparsiflora (E.Mey.) B.-E.van Wyk, indigenous
 Lotononis spicata Compton, accepted as Leobordea spicata (Compton) B.-E.van Wyk & Boatwr.
 Lotononis stenophylla (Eckl. & Zeyh.) B.-E.van Wyk, endemic
 Lotononis stipulosa Baker f. accepted as Leobordea stipulosa (Baker f.) B.-E.van Wyk & Boatwr. indigenous
 Lotononis stricta (Eckl. & Zeyh.) B.-E.van Wyk, indigenous
 Lotononis strigillosa (Merxm. & A.Schreib.) A.Schreib. indigenous
 Lotononis subulata B.-E.van Wyk, accepted as Listia subulata (B.-E.van Wyk) B.-E.van Wyk & Boatwr. endemic
 Lotononis sutherlandii Dummer, accepted as Leobordea sutherlandii (Dummer) B.-E.van Wyk & Boatwr. endemic
 Lotononis tenella (E.Mey.) Eckl. & Zeyh., endemic
 Lotononis trichodes (E.Mey.) B.-E.van Wyk, endemic
 Lotononis umbellata (L.) Benth. endemic
 Lotononis varia (E.Mey.) Steud. endemic
 Lotononis venosa B.-E.van Wyk, endemic
 Lotononis viborgioides Benth. endemic
 Lotononis villosa (E.Mey.) Steud. endemic
 Lotononis viminea (E.Mey.) B.-E.van Wyk, endemic
 Lotononis virgata B.-E.van Wyk, endemic
 Lotononis wilmsii Dummer, accepted as Leobordea hirsuta (Schinz) B.-E.van Wyk & Boatwr. endemic

Lotus
Genus Lotus:
 Lotus arabicus L. indigenous
 Lotus corniculatus L. not indigenous, naturalised
 Lotus corniculatus L. var. corniculatus, not indigenous, naturalised
 Lotus discolor E.Mey. indigenous
 Lotus discolor E.Mey. subsp. discolor, indigenous
 Lotus mossamedensis Welw. ex Baker, accepted as Lotus arabicus L. present
 Lotus namulensis Brand, indigenous
 Lotus subbiflorus Lag. not indigenous, naturalised
 Lotus subbiflorus Lag. subsp. subbiflorus, not indigenous, naturalised

Lupinus
Genus Lupinus:
 Lupinus angustifolius L. not indigenous, naturalised
 Lupinus consentinii Guss. not indigenous, naturalised
 Lupinus luteus L. not indigenous, naturalised
 Lupinus pilosus L., not indigenous, naturalised

Macroptilium
Genus Macroptilium:
 Macroptilium atropurpureum (DC.) Urb. not indigenous, naturalised, invasive

Macrotyloma
Genus Macrotyloma:
 Macrotyloma axillare (E.Mey.) Verdc. indigenous
 Macrotyloma axillare (E.Mey.) Verdc. var. axillare, indigenous
 Macrotyloma axillare (E.Mey.) Verdc. var. glabrum (E.Mey.) Verdc. indigenous
 Macrotyloma coddii Verdc. endemic
 Macrotyloma maranguense (Taub.) Verdc. indigenous
 Macrotyloma uniflorum (Lam.) Verdc. indigenous
 Macrotyloma uniflorum (Lam.) Verdc. var. stenocarpum (Brenan) Verdc. indigenous

Medicago
Genus Medicago:
 Medicago falcata L. not indigenous, naturalised
 Medicago laciniata (L.) Mill. var. laciniata, not indigenous, naturalised
 Medicago lupulina L. not indigenous, naturalised
 Medicago polymorpha L. not indigenous, naturalised, invasive
 Medicago sativa L. not indigenous, cultivated, naturalised, invasive
 Medicago sativa L. subsp. sativa, not indigenous, cultivated, naturalised, invasive
 Medicago x hemicycla  Grossh. not indigenous, naturalised

Melilotus
Genus Melilotus:
 Melilotus albus Medik., not indigenous, naturalised, invasive
 Melilotus indicus (L.) All. not indigenous, naturalised, invasive
 Melilotus officinalis (L.) Pall. not indigenous, naturalised

Melolobium
Genus Melolobium:
 Melolobium adenodes Eckl. & Zeyh. indigenous
 Melolobium aethiopicum (L.) Druce, endemic
 Melolobium alpinum Eckl. & Zeyh. indigenous
 Melolobium burchelli N.E.Br. accepted as Melolobium microphyllum (L.f.) Eckl. & Zeyh. present
 Melolobium calycinum Benth. indigenous
 Melolobium candicans (E.Mey.) Eckl. & Zeyh. indigenous
 Melolobium canescens Benth. indigenous
 Melolobium decumbens (E.Mey.) Burtt Davy, accepted as Melolobium microphyllum (L.f.) Eckl. & Zeyh.
 Melolobium exudans Harv. endemic
 Melolobium glanduliferum Dummer, accepted as Melolobium microphyllum (L.f.) Eckl. & Zeyh. present
 Melolobium humile Eckl. & Zeyh. endemic
 Melolobium karasbergense L.Bolus, accepted as Melolobium adenodes Eckl. & Zeyh. present
 Melolobium lampolobum (E.Mey.) Moteetee & B.-E.van Wyk, endemic
 Melolobium macrocalyx Dummer, indigenous
 Melolobium macrocalyx Dummer var. longifolium Dummer, indigenous
 Melolobium macrocalyx Dummer var. macrocalyx, indigenous
 Melolobium microphyllum (L.f.) Eckl. & Zeyh. indigenous
 Melolobium obcordatum Harv. indigenous
 Melolobium parviflorum Benth. accepted as Melolobium candicans (E.Mey.) Eckl. & Zeyh. present
 Melolobium pegleri Dummer, accepted as Melolobium alpinum Eckl. & Zeyh. present
 Melolobium stipulatum (Thunb.) Harv. endemic
 Melolobium subspicatum Conrath, endemic
 Melolobium villosum Harms, accepted as Melolobium calycinum Benth. present
 Melolobium wilmsii Harms, endemic

Microcharis
Genus Microcharis:
 Microcharis disjuncta (J.B.Gillett) Schrire, indigenous
 Microcharis disjuncta (J.B.Gillett) Schrire var. disjuncta, indigenous
 Microcharis galpinii N.E.Br. indigenous
 Microcharis latifolia Benth. indigenous

Millettia
Genus Millettia:
 Millettia grandis (E.Mey.) Skeels, endemic
 Millettia stuhlmannii Taub. indigenous
 Millettia sutherlandii Harv. accepted as Philenoptera sutherlandii (Harv.) Schrire, indigenous

Mimosa
Genus Mimosa:
 Mimosa pigra L. not indigenous, naturalised, invasive
 Mimosa pudica L. var. hispida Brenan, not indigenous, naturalised

Mucuna
Genus Mucuna:
 Mucuna coriacea Baker, indigenous
 Mucuna coriacea Baker subsp. irritans (Burtt Davy) Verdc. indigenous
 Mucuna gigantea (Willd.) DC. indigenous
 Mucuna gigantea (Willd.) DC. subsp. gigantea, indigenous
 Mucuna pruriens (L.) DC. indigenous
 Mucuna pruriens (L.) DC. var. pruriens, indigenous
 Mucuna pruriens (L.) DC. var. utilis (Wall. ex Wight) Baker ex Burck, not indigenous, naturalised

Mundulea
Genus Mundulea:
 Mundulea sericea (Willd.) A.Chev. indigenous
 Mundulea sericea (Willd.) A.Chev. subsp. sericea, indigenous

Neonotonia
Genus Neonotonia:
 Neonotonia wightii (Wight ex Arn.) J.A.Lackey, indigenous

Neorautanenia
Genus Neorautanenia:
 Neorautanenia amboensis Schinz, accepted as Neorautanenia mitis (A.Rich.) Verdc. indigenous
 Neorautanenia brachypus (Harms) C.A.Sm. accepted as Neorautanenia mitis (A.Rich.) Verdc. present
 Neorautanenia deserticola C.A.Sm. accepted as Neorautanenia ficifolia (Benth. ex Harv.) C.A.Sm. present
 Neorautanenia ficifolia (Benth. ex Harv.) C.A.Sm. indigenous
 Neorautanenia mitis (A.Rich.) Verdc. indigenous

Neptunia
Genus Neptunia:
 Neptunia oleracea Lour. indigenous

Nesphostylis
Genus Nesphostylis:
 Nesphostylis junodii (Harms) Munyeny. & F.A.Bisby, indigenous

Newtonia
Genus Newtonia:
 Newtonia hildebrandtii (Vatke) Torre, indigenous
 Newtonia hildebrandtii (Vatke) Torre var. hildebrandtii, indigenous

Ononis
Genus Ononis:
 Ononis excisa Thunb. accepted as Crotalaria excisa (Thunb.) Baker f. subsp. excisa, indigenous
 Ononis quinata Thunb. accepted as Leobordea quinata (E.Mey.) B.-E.van Wyk & Boatwr. indigenous

Ophrestia
Genus Ophrestia:
 Ophrestia oblongifolia (E.Mey.) H.M.L.Forbes, indigenous
 Ophrestia oblongifolia (E.Mey.) H.M.L.Forbes var. oblongifolia, indigenous
 Ophrestia oblongifolia (E.Mey.) H.M.L.Forbes var. velutinosa H.M.L.Forbes, endemic

Ormocarpum
Genus Ormocarpum:
 Ormocarpum kirkii S.Moore, indigenous
 Ormocarpum trichocarpum (Taub.) Engl. indigenous

Ornithopus
Genus Ornithopus:
 Ornithopus compressus L. not indigenous, cultivated, naturalised, invasive
 Ornithopus pinnatus (Mill.) Druce, not indigenous, cultivated, naturalised
 Ornithopus sativus Brot. not indigenous, cultivated, naturalised, invasive

Otholobium
Genus Otholobium:
 Otholobium accrescens C.H.Stirt. endemic
 Otholobium acuminatum (Lam.) C.H.Stirt. endemic
 Otholobium arborescens C.H.Stirt. endemic
 Otholobium argenteum (Thunb.) C.H.Stirt. endemic
 Otholobium bolusii (H.M.L.Forbes) C.H.Stirt. endemic
 Otholobium bowieanum (Harv.) C.H.Stirt. endemic
 Otholobium bracteolatum (Eckl. & Zeyh.) C.H.Stirt. endemic
 Otholobium caffrum (Eckl. & Zeyh.) C.H.Stirt. endemic
 Otholobium candicans (Eckl. & Zeyh.) C.H.Stirt. endemic
 Otholobium carneum (E.Mey.) C.H.Stirt. endemic
 Otholobium decumbens (Aiton) C.H.Stirt. accepted as Otholobium virgatum (Burm.f.) C.H.Stirt. present
 Otholobium flexuosum C.H.Stirt. endemic
 Otholobium foliosum (Oliv.) C.H.Stirt. indigenous
 Otholobium foliosum (Oliv.) C.H.Stirt. subsp. gazense (Baker f.) Verdc. indigenous
 Otholobium fruticans (L.) C.H.Stirt. endemic
 Otholobium fumeum C.H.Stirt. endemic
 Otholobium hamatum (Harv.) C.H.Stirt. endemic
 Otholobium heterosepalum (Fourc.) C.H.Stirt. endemic
 Otholobium hirtum (L.) C.H.Stirt. endemic
 Otholobium incanum C.H.Stirt. endemic
 Otholobium macradenium (Harv.) C.H.Stirt. endemic
 Otholobium mundianum (Eckl. & Zeyh.) C.H.Stirt. endemic
 Otholobium nigricans C.H.Stirt. indigenous
 Otholobium obliquum (E.Mey.) C.H.Stirt. endemic
 Otholobium parviflorum (E.Mey.) C.H.Stirt. endemic
 Otholobium pictum C.H.Stirt. endemic
 Otholobium polyphyllum (Eckl. & Zeyh.) C.H.Stirt. endemic
 Otholobium polystictum (Benth. ex Harv.) C.H.Stirt. indigenous
 Otholobium prodiens C.H.Stirt. indigenous
 Otholobium pungens C.H.Stirt. endemic
 Otholobium pustulatum C.H.Stirt. endemic
 Otholobium racemosum (Thunb.) C.H.Stirt. endemic
 Otholobium rotundifolium (L.f.) C.H.Stirt. endemic
 Otholobium rubicundum C.H.Stirt. endemic
 Otholobium saxosum C.H.Stirt. endemic
 Otholobium sericeum (Poir.) C.H.Stirt. endemic
 Otholobium spicatum (L.) C.H.Stirt. endemic
 Otholobium stachyerum (Eckl. & Zeyh.) C.H.Stirt. endemic
 Otholobium striatum (Thunb.) C.H.Stirt. endemic
 Otholobium swartbergense C.H.Stirt. endemic
 Otholobium thomii (Harv.) C.H.Stirt. endemic
 Otholobium trianthum (E.Mey.) C.H.Stirt. endemic
 Otholobium uncinatum (Eckl. & Zeyh.) C.H.Stirt. endemic
 Otholobium venustum (Eckl. & Zeyh.) C.H.Stirt. endemic
 Otholobium virgatum (Burm.f.) C.H.Stirt. endemic
 Otholobium wilmsii (Harms) C.H.Stirt. indigenous
 Otholobium zeyheri (Harv.) C.H.Stirt. endemic

Otoptera
Genus Otoptera:
 Otoptera burchellii DC. indigenous

Paraserianthes
Genus Paraserianthes:
 Paraserianthes lophantha (Willd.) I.C.Nielsen, accepted as Paraserianthes lophantha (Willd.) I.C.Nielsen subsp. lophantha, not indigenous, naturalised
 Paraserianthes lophantha (Willd.) I.C.Nielsen subsp. lophantha, not indigenous, naturalised, invasive

Parkinsonia
Genus Parkinsonia:
 Parkinsonia aculeata L. not indigenous, naturalised, invasive
 Parkinsonia africana Sond. indigenous

Pearsonia
Genus Pearsonia:
 Pearsonia aristata (Schinz) Dummer, indigenous
 Pearsonia bracteata (Benth.) Polhill, endemic
 Pearsonia cajanifolia (Harv.) Polhill, indigenous
 Pearsonia cajanifolia (Harv.) Polhill subsp. cajanifolia, endemic
 Pearsonia cajanifolia (Harv.) Polhill subsp. cryptantha (Baker) Polhill, indigenous
 Pearsonia callistoma Campb.-Young & K.Balkwill, endemic
 Pearsonia grandifolia (Bolus) Polhill, indigenous
 Pearsonia grandifolia (Bolus) Polhill subsp. grandifolia,   endemic
 Pearsonia grandifolia (Bolus) Polhill subsp. latibracteolata (Dummer) Polhill, indigenous
 Pearsonia hirsuta Germish. endemic
 Pearsonia mbabanensis Compton, accepted as Pearsonia sessilifolia (Harv.) Dummer subsp. marginata (Schinz) Polhill
 Pearsonia obovata (Schinz) Polhill, endemic
 Pearsonia sessilifolia (Harv.) Dummer, indigenous
 Pearsonia sessilifolia (Harv.) Dummer subsp. filifolia (Bolus) Polhill, indigenous
 Pearsonia sessilifolia (Harv.) Dummer subsp. marginata (Schinz) Polhill, indigenous
 Pearsonia sessilifolia (Harv.) Dummer subsp. sessilifolia, indigenous
 Pearsonia sessilifolia (Harv.) Dummer subsp. swaziensis (Bolus) Polhill, indigenous
 Pearsonia uniflora (Kensit) Polhill, indigenous

Peltophorum
Genus  Peltophorum:
 Peltophorum africanum Sond. indigenous

Philenoptera
Genus  Philenoptera:
 Philenoptera bussei (Harms) Schrire, indigenous
 Philenoptera sutherlandii (Harv.) Schrire, endemic
 Philenoptera violacea (Klotzsch) Schrire, indigenous

Piliostigma
Genus  Piliostigma:
 Piliostigma thonningii (Schumach.) Milne-Redh. indigenous

Pleiospora
Genus  Pleiospora:
 Pleiospora holosericea Schinz, accepted as Pearsonia cajanifolia (Harv.) Polhill subsp. cryptantha (Baker) Polhill, present

Podalyria
Genus  Podalyria:
 Podalyria amoena Eckl. & Zeyh. endemic
 Podalyria argentea Salisb., endemic
 Podalyria biflora Lam., endemic
 Podalyria burchellii DC., endemic
 Podalyria buxifolia (Retz.) Willd., endemic
 Podalyria calyptrata (Retz.) Willd. endemic
 Podalyria canescens E.Mey., endemic
 Podalyria chrysantha Adamson, accepted as Stirtonanthus chrysanthus (Adamson) B.-E.van Wyk & A.L.Schutte, present
 Podalyria cordata R.Br. endemic
 Podalyria cuneifolia Vent., endemic
 Podalyria glauca DC. endemic
 Podalyria hamata E.Mey. endemic
 Podalyria hirsuta (Aiton) Willd. endemic
 Podalyria insignis Compton, accepted as Stirtonanthus insignis (Compton) B.-E.van Wyk & A.L.Schutte, present
 Podalyria leipoldtii L.Bolus, endemic
 Podalyria microphylla E.Mey. endemic
 Podalyria montana Hutch. endemic
 Podalyria myrtillifolia (Retz.) Willd., endemic
 Podalyria oleaefolia Salisb. endemic
 Podalyria orbicularis E.Mey. endemic
 Podalyria pearsonii E.Phillips, endemic
 Podalyria pulcherrima Schinz, endemic
 Podalyria racemulosa Eckl. & Zeyh. endemic
 Podalyria reticulata Harv. endemic
 Podalyria rotundifolia (P.J.Bergius) A.L.Schutte, indigenous
 Podalyria sericea (Andrews) R.Br. ex Aiton f. endemic
 Podalyria speciosa Eckl. & Zeyh. endemic
 Podalyria tayloriana L.Bolus, accepted as Stirtonanthus taylorianus (L.Bolus) B.-E.van Wyk & A.L.Schutte, present
 Podalyria variabilis A.L.Schutte, endemic
 Podalyria velutina Burch. ex Benth. endemic

Polhillia
Genus  Polhillia:
 Polhillia brevicalyx (C.H.Stirt.) B.-E.van Wyk & A.L.Schutte, endemic
 Polhillia canescens C.H.Stirt. endemic
 Polhillia connatum (Harv.) C.H.Stirt. endemic
 Polhillia ignota Boatwr. endemic
 Polhillia involucrata (Thunb.) B.-E.van Wyk & A.L.Schutte, endemic
 Polhillia obsoleta (Harv.) B.-E.van Wyk, endemic
 Polhillia pallens C.H.Stirt. endemic

Polytropia
Genus  Polytropia:
 Polytropia ferulifolia C.Presl, accepted as Rhynchosia ferulifolia (C.Presl) Benth. ex Harv. indigenous
 Polytropia pinnata Eckl. & Zeyh. accepted as Rhynchosia pinnata (Eckl. & Zeyh.) Harv. indigenous
 Polytropia umbellata L. accepted as Rhynchosia ferulifolia (C.Presl) Benth. ex Harv. indigenous

Pomaria
Genus Pomaria:
 Pomaria burchellii (DC.) B.B.Simpson & G.P.Lewis, indigenous
 Pomaria burchellii (DC.) B.B.Simpson & G.P.Lewis subsp. burchellii,   indigenous
 Pomaria burchellii (DC.) B.B.Simpson & G.P.Lewis subsp. rubro-violacea (Baker f.) Brummitt, indigenous
 Pomaria lactea (Schinz) B.B.Simpson & G.P.Lewis, indigenous
 Pomaria sandersonii (Harv.) B.B.Simpson & G.P.Lewis, endemic

Priestleya
Genus Priestleya:
 Priestleya angustifolia Eckl. & Zeyh. accepted as Liparia angustifolia (Eckl. & Zeyh.) A.L.Schutte, present
 Priestleya boucheri E.G.H.Oliv. & Fellingham, accepted as Liparia boucheri (E.G.H.Oliv. & Fellingham) A.L.Schutte, present
 Priestleya calycina L.Bolus, accepted as Liparia calycina (L.Bolus) A.L.Schutte, present
 Priestleya capitata (Thunb.) DC. accepted as Liparia capitata Thunb. present
 Priestleya hirsuta (Thunb.) DC. accepted as Liparia hirsuta Thunb. present
 Priestleya laevigata (L.) DC. accepted as Liparia laevigata (L.) Thunb. endemic
 Priestleya laevigata (L.) Druce, accepted as Liparia laevigata (L.) Thunb. endemic
 Priestleya latifolia Benth. accepted as Liparia latifolia (Benth.) A.L.Schutte, present
 Priestleya leiocarpa Eckl. & Zeyh. accepted as Liparia myrtifolia Thunb. present
 Priestleya myrtifolia DC. accepted as Liparia myrtifolia Thunb. present
 Priestleya thunbergii Benth. accepted as Liparia laevigata (L.) Thunb. present
 Priestleya tomentosa (L.) Druce, accepted as Liparia vestita Thunb. present
 Priestleya umbellifera (Thunb.) DC., accepted as Liparia umbellifera Thunb. present

Prosopis
Genus Prosopis:
 Prosopis chilensis (Molina) Stuntz, not indigenous, naturalised
 Prosopis glandulosa Torr. not indigenous, naturalised
 Prosopis glandulosa Torr. var. glandulosa,   not indigenous, naturalised
 Prosopis glandulosa Torr. var. torreyana (Benson) M.C.Johnst. not indigenous, naturalised, invasive
 Prosopis pubescens Benth. not indigenous, naturalised
 Prosopis velutina Wooton, not indigenous, naturalised, invasive

Pseudarthria
Genus Pseudarthria:
 Pseudarthria hookeri Wight & Arn. indigenous
 Pseudarthria hookeri Wight & Arn. var. hookeri,   indigenous

Psoralea
Genus Psoralea:
 Psoralea abbottii C.H.Stirt. indigenous
 Psoralea aculeata L., endemic
 Psoralea affinis Eckl. & Zeyh. endemic
 Psoralea alata (Thunb.) T.M.Salter, endemic
 Psoralea angustifolia Jacq. endemic
 Psoralea aphylla L. endemic
 Psoralea arborea Sims, indigenous
 Psoralea asarina (P.J.Bergius) T.M.Salter, endemic
 Psoralea axillaris L., endemic
 Psoralea capitata L.f. accepted as Psoralea ensifolia (Houtt.) Merr. present
 Psoralea cataracta C.H.Stirt. endemic
 Psoralea diturnerae A.Bello, C.H.Stirt. & Muasya, endemic
 Psoralea ensifolia (Houtt.) Merr. indigenous
 Psoralea fascicularis DC. endemic
 Psoralea filifolia Thunb. endemic
 Psoralea fleta C.H.Stirt. endemic
 Psoralea fruticans (L.) Druce, accepted as Otholobium fruticans (L.) C.H.Stirt. present
 Psoralea gigantea Dludlu, Muasya & C.H.Stirt. endemic
 Psoralea glabra E.Mey. indigenous
 Psoralea glaucescens Eckl. & Zeyh. endemic
 Psoralea glaucina Harv. endemic
 Psoralea gueinzii Harv. endemic
 Psoralea imbricata (L.) T.M.Salter, endemic
 Psoralea implexa C.H.Stirt. endemic
 Psoralea keetii Schonland ex H.M.L.Forbes, endemic
 Psoralea kougaensis C.H.Stirt. Muasya & A.Bello, endemic
 Psoralea latifolia (Harv.) C.H.Stirt. accepted as Psoralea arborea Sims, present
 Psoralea laxa T.M.Salter, endemic
 Psoralea margaretiflora C.H.Stirt. & V.R.Clark, indigenous
 Psoralea monophylla (L.) C.H.Stirt. endemic
 Psoralea odoratissima Jacq. endemic
 Psoralea oligophylla Eckl. & Zeyh. endemic
 Psoralea oreophila Schltr. endemic
 Psoralea peratica C.H.Stirt. endemic
 Psoralea pinnata L. indigenous
 Psoralea pinnata L. var. latifolia Harv. accepted as Psoralea arborea Sims, indigenous
 Psoralea pinnata L. var. pinnata,   endemic
 Psoralea plauta C.H.Stirt. endemic
 Psoralea prostrata L. accepted as Rhynchosia ferulifolia (C.Presl) Benth. ex Harv. indigenous
 Psoralea pullata C.H.Stirt. endemic
 Psoralea ramulosa C.H.Stirt. endemic
 Psoralea repens L. endemic
 Psoralea restioides Eckl. & Zeyh. endemic
 Psoralea speciosa Eckl. & Zeyh. endemic
 Psoralea tenuifolia L., endemic
 Psoralea tenuifolia Thunb., accepted as Psoralea fascicularis DC. endemic
 Psoralea tenuissima E.Mey. endemic
 Psoralea triflora Thunb., endemic
 Psoralea trullata C.H.Stirt. endemic
 Psoralea usitata C.H.Stirt. endemic
 Psoralea vanberkelae C.H.Stirt. A.Bello & Muasya, endemic
 Psoralea verrucosa Willd. endemic

Pterocarpus
Genus Pterocarpus:
 Pterocarpus angolensis DC. indigenous
 Pterocarpus lucens Lepr. ex Guill. & Perr. indigenous
 Pterocarpus lucens Lepr. ex Guill. & Perr. subsp. antunesii (Taub.) Rojo, indigenous
 Pterocarpus rotundifolius (Sond.) Druce, indigenous
 Pterocarpus rotundifolius (Sond.) Druce subsp. rotundifolius,   indigenous

Pterolobium
Genus Pterolobium:
 Pterolobium stellatum (Forssk.) Brenan, indigenous

Ptycholobium
Genus Ptycholobium:
 Ptycholobium biflorum (E.Mey.) Brummitt, indigenous
 Ptycholobium biflorum (E.Mey.) Brummitt subsp. biflorum,   indigenous
 Ptycholobium contortum (N.E.Br.) Brummitt, indigenous
 Ptycholobium plicatum (Oliv.) Harms, indigenous
 Ptycholobium plicatum (Oliv.) Harms subsp. plicatum,   indigenous

Pueraria
Genus Pueraria:
 Pueraria montana (Lour.) Merr. not indigenous, naturalised
 Pueraria montana (Lour.) Merr. var. lobata (Willd.) Maesen & S.M.Almeida ex Sanjappa & Predeep, not indigenous, naturalised, invasive

Rafnia
Genus Rafnia:
 Rafnia acuminata (E.Mey.) G.J.Campb. & B.-E.van Wyk, endemic
 Rafnia affinis Harv. accepted as Rafnia elliptica Thunb., present
 Rafnia alata G.J.Campb. & B.-E.van Wyk, endemic
 Rafnia amplexicaulis (L.) Thunb. endemic
 Rafnia angulata Thunb. indigenous
 Rafnia angulata Thunb. subsp. angulata,   endemic
 Rafnia angulata Thunb. subsp. ericifolia (T.M.Salter) G.J.Campb. & B.-E.van Wyk, endemic
 Rafnia angulata Thunb. subsp. humilis (Eckl. & Zeyh.) G.J.Campb. & B.-E.van Wyk, endemic
 Rafnia angulata Thunb. subsp. montana G.J.Campb. & B.-E.van Wyk, endemic
 Rafnia angulata Thunb. subsp. thunbergii (Harv.) G.J.Campb. & B.-E.van Wyk, endemic
 Rafnia axillaris Thunb., accepted as Rafnia elliptica Thunb., present
 Rafnia capensis (L.) Schinz, indigenous
 Rafnia capensis (L.) Schinz subsp. calycina G.J.Campb. & B.-E.van Wyk, endemic
 Rafnia capensis (L.) Schinz subsp. capensis,   endemic
 Rafnia capensis (L.) Schinz subsp. carinata G.J.Campb. & B.-E.van Wyk, endemic
 Rafnia capensis (L.) Schinz subsp. dichotoma (Eckl. & Zeyh.) G.J.Campb. & B.-E.van Wyk, endemic
 Rafnia capensis (L.) Schinz subsp. elsieae G.J.Campb. & B.-E.van Wyk, endemic
 Rafnia capensis (L.) Schinz subsp. ovata (P.J.Bergius) G.J.Campb. & B.-E.van Wyk, endemic
 Rafnia capensis (L.) Schinz subsp. pedicellata G.J.Campb. & B.-E.van Wyk, endemic
 Rafnia crassifolia Harv. endemic
 Rafnia crispa C.H.Stirt. endemic
 Rafnia cuneifolia Thunb. accepted as Rafnia capensis (L.) Schinz subsp. ovata (P.J.Bergius) G.J.Campb. & B.-E.van Wyk, present
 Rafnia dichotoma Eckl. & Zeyh. accepted as Rafnia capensis (L.) Schinz subsp. dichotoma (Eckl. & Zeyh.) G.J.Campb. & B.-E.van Wyk, present
 Rafnia diffusa Thunb., endemic
 Rafnia elliptica Thunb., endemic
 Rafnia ericifolia T.M.Salter, accepted as Rafnia angulata Thunb. subsp. ericifolia (T.M.Salter) G.J.Campb. & B.-E.van Wyk, present
 Rafnia fastigiata Eckl. & Zeyh. accepted as Rafnia triflora Thunb. present
 Rafnia globosa G.J.Campb. & B.-E.van Wyk, endemic
 Rafnia inaequalis G.J.Campb. & B.-E.van Wyk, endemic
 Rafnia lancea (Thunb.) DC. endemic
 Rafnia meyeri Schinz, accepted as Rafnia ovata E.Mey., present
 Rafnia opposita (L.) Thunb. accepted as Rafnia capensis (L.) Schinz subsp. capensis,   present
 Rafnia ovata (P.J.Bergius) Schinz, accepted as Rafnia capensis (L.) Schinz subsp. ovata (P.J.Bergius) G.J.Campb. & B.-E.van Wyk, present
 Rafnia ovata E.Mey., endemic
 Rafnia racemosa Eckl. & Zeyh. indigenous
 Rafnia racemosa Eckl. & Zeyh. subsp. pumila G.J.Campb. & B.-E.van Wyk, endemic
 Rafnia racemosa Eckl. & Zeyh. subsp. racemosa,   endemic
 Rafnia retroflexa Thunb. accepted as Rafnia capensis (L.) Schinz subsp. capensis,   present
 Rafnia rostrata G.J.Campb. & B.-E.van Wyk, indigenous
 Rafnia rostrata G.J.Campb. & B.-E.van Wyk subsp. pluriflora G.J.Campb. & B.-E.van Wyk, endemic
 Rafnia rostrata G.J.Campb. & B.-E.van Wyk subsp. rostrata,   endemic
 Rafnia schlechteriana Schinz, endemic
 Rafnia spicata Thunb., endemic
 Rafnia thunbergii Harv. accepted as Rafnia angulata Thunb. subsp. thunbergii (Harv.) G.J.Campb. & B.-E.van Wyk, present
 Rafnia triflora Thunb. endemic
 Rafnia vlokii G.J.Campb. & B.-E.van Wyk, endemic

Requienia
Genus Requienia:
 Requienia pseudosphaerosperma (Schinz) Brummitt, indigenous
 Requienia sphaerosperma DC. indigenous

Rhynchosia
Genus Rhynchosia:
 Rhynchosia adenodes Eckl. & Zeyh. indigenous
 Rhynchosia adenodes Eckl. & Zeyh. var. cooperi Harv. ex Baker f. accepted as Rhynchosia cooperi (Harv. ex Baker f.) Burtt Davy, indigenous
 Rhynchosia albiflora (Sims) Alston, accepted as Rhynchosia hirta (Andrews) Meikle & Verdc. present
 Rhynchosia albissima Gand. indigenous
 Rhynchosia angulosa Schinz, indigenous
 Rhynchosia angustifolia (Jacq.) DC. endemic
 Rhynchosia argentea (Thunb.) Harv. endemic
 Rhynchosia arida C.H.Stirt. endemic
 Rhynchosia atropurpurea Germish. indigenous
 Rhynchosia bolusii Boatwr. & Moteetee, endemic
 Rhynchosia bullata Benth. ex Harv. endemic
 Rhynchosia calvescens Meikle, endemic
 Rhynchosia capensis (Burm.f.) Schinz, endemic
 Rhynchosia caribaea (Jacq.) DC. indigenous
 Rhynchosia chrysantha Schltr. ex Zahlbr. endemic
 Rhynchosia chrysoscias Benth. ex Harv. endemic
 Rhynchosia ciliata (Thunb.) Schinz, endemic
 Rhynchosia cinnamomea Schinz, accepted as Rhynchosia totta (Thunb.) DC. var. venulosa (Hiern) Verdc. indigenous
 Rhynchosia clivorum S.Moore, indigenous
 Rhynchosia clivorum S.Moore subsp. clivorum,   indigenous
 Rhynchosia clivorum S.Moore subsp. pycnantha (Harms) Verdc. indigenous
 Rhynchosia clivorum S.Moore var. clivorum,   accepted as Rhynchosia clivorum S.Moore subsp. clivorum,   indigenous
 Rhynchosia confusa Burtt Davy, indigenous
 Rhynchosia connata Baker f. endemic
 Rhynchosia cooperi (Harv. ex Baker f.) Burtt Davy, indigenous
 Rhynchosia crassifolia Benth. ex Harv. indigenous
 Rhynchosia densiflora (Roth) DC. indigenous
 Rhynchosia densiflora (Roth) DC. subsp. chrysadenia (Taub.) Verdc. indigenous
 Rhynchosia elegantissima Schinz, accepted as Rhynchosia totta (Thunb.) DC. var. venulosa (Hiern) Verdc. indigenous
 Rhynchosia emarginata Germish. endemic
 Rhynchosia ferulifolia (C.Presl) Benth. ex Harv. endemic
 Rhynchosia foliosa Markotter, endemic
 Rhynchosia galpinii Baker f. endemic
 Rhynchosia grandifolia Steud. endemic
 Rhynchosia harmsiana Schltr. ex Zahlbr. indigenous
 Rhynchosia harmsiana Schltr. ex Zahlbr. var. burchellii Burtt Davy, indigenous
 Rhynchosia harmsiana Schltr. ex Zahlbr. var. harmsiana,   indigenous
 Rhynchosia harveyi Eckl. & Zeyh. endemic
 Rhynchosia hirsuta Eckl. & Zeyh., indigenous
 Rhynchosia hirta (Andrews) Meikle & Verdc. indigenous
 Rhynchosia holosericea Schinz, indigenous
 Rhynchosia humilis Eckl. & Zeyh. accepted as Rhynchosia totta (Thunb.) DC. var. totta,   indigenous
 Rhynchosia jacottetii Schinz, accepted as Rhynchosia reptabunda N.E.Br. present
 Rhynchosia komatiensis Harms, indigenous
 Rhynchosia leucoscias Benth. ex Harv. endemic
 Rhynchosia longiflora Schinz, accepted as Rhynchosia totta (Thunb.) DC. var. rigidula (DC.) Moteetee & M.M.le Roux
 Rhynchosia microscias Benth. ex Harv. endemic
 Rhynchosia minima (L.) DC. indigenous
 Rhynchosia minima (L.) DC. var. falcata (E.Mey.) Verdc. indigenous
 Rhynchosia minima (L.) DC. var. minima,   indigenous
 Rhynchosia minima (L.) DC. var. prostrata (Harv.) Meikle, indigenous
 Rhynchosia mollis Burtt Davy, accepted as Rhynchosia totta (Thunb.) DC. var. venulosa (Hiern) Verdc. indigenous
 Rhynchosia monophylla Schltr. indigenous
 Rhynchosia namaensis Schinz, accepted as Rhynchosia totta (Thunb.) DC. var. rigidula (DC.) Moteetee & M.M.le Roux
 Rhynchosia nervosa Benth. ex Harv. indigenous
 Rhynchosia nervosa Benth. ex Harv. var. nervosa,   indigenous
 Rhynchosia nervosa Benth. ex Harv. var. petiolata Burtt Davy, accepted as Rhynchosia totta (Thunb.) DC. var. totta,   endemic
 Rhynchosia nitens Benth. ex Harv. indigenous
 Rhynchosia ovata J.M.Wood & M.S.Evans, endemic
 Rhynchosia paniculata (E.Mey.) Steud. accepted as Rhynchosia totta (Thunb.) DC. var. totta,   indigenous
 Rhynchosia parviflora (E.Mey.) Druce, accepted as Rhynchosia microscias Benth. ex Harv. present
 Rhynchosia pauciflora Bolus, indigenous
 Rhynchosia pedunculata M.M.le Roux & Moteetee, endemic
 Rhynchosia peglerae Baker f. endemic
 Rhynchosia pentheri Schltr. ex Zahlbr. indigenous
 Rhynchosia pentheri Schltr. ex Zahlbr. var. hutchinsoniana Burtt Davy, indigenous
 Rhynchosia pentheri Schltr. ex Zahlbr. var. pentheri,   indigenous
 Rhynchosia pilosa (E.Mey.) Harv., accepted as Rhynchosia totta (Thunb.) DC. var. totta,   indigenous
 Rhynchosia pilosa (E.Mey.) Steud., accepted as Rhynchosia totta (Thunb.) DC. var. totta,   indigenous
 Rhynchosia pinnata (Eckl. & Zeyh.) Harv. endemic
 Rhynchosia remota Conrath, accepted as Rhynchosia totta (Thunb.) DC. var. venulosa (Hiern) Verdc. indigenous
 Rhynchosia reptabunda N.E.Br. indigenous
 Rhynchosia resinosa (Hochst. ex A.Rich.) Baker, indigenous
 Rhynchosia rigidula DC. accepted as Rhynchosia totta (Thunb.) DC. var. rigidula (DC.) Moteetee & M.M.le Roux, indigenous
 Rhynchosia rogersii Schinz, indigenous
 Rhynchosia schlechteri Baker f. endemic
 Rhynchosia smithiana Moteetee & Boatwr. endemic
 Rhynchosia sordida (E.Mey.) Schinz, indigenous
 Rhynchosia spectabilis Schinz, endemic
 Rhynchosia stenodon Baker f. endemic
 Rhynchosia sublobata (Schumach.) Meikle, indigenous
 Rhynchosia thorncroftii (Baker f.) Burtt Davy, indigenous
 Rhynchosia totta (Thunb.) DC. indigenous
 Rhynchosia totta (Thunb.) DC. var. fenchelii Schinz, accepted as Rhynchosia totta (Thunb.) DC. var. venulosa (Hiern) Verdc. 
 Rhynchosia totta (Thunb.) DC. var. graciliflora Harms ex Baker f. accepted as Rhynchosia totta (Thunb.) DC. var. totta, indigenous
 Rhynchosia totta (Thunb.) DC. var. longicalyx Moteetee & M.M.le Roux, indigenous
 Rhynchosia totta (Thunb.) DC. var. namaensis (Schinz) Baker f. accepted as Rhynchosia totta (Thunb.) DC. var. rigidula (DC.) Moteetee & M.M.le Roux
 Rhynchosia totta (Thunb.) DC. var. pilosa (E.Mey.) Baker f. accepted as Rhynchosia totta (Thunb.) DC. var. totta,   indigenous
 Rhynchosia totta (Thunb.) DC. var. rigidula (DC.) Moteetee & M.M.le Roux, indigenous
 Rhynchosia totta (Thunb.) DC. var. totta,   indigenous
 Rhynchosia totta (Thunb.) DC. var. unifoliolata (Burtt Davy) Baker f. accepted as Rhynchosia totta (Thunb.) DC. var. totta, indigenous
 Rhynchosia totta (Thunb.) DC. var. venulosa (Hiern) Verdc. indigenous
 Rhynchosia unifoliolata Burtt Davy, accepted as Rhynchosia totta (Thunb.) DC. var. totta, indigenous
 Rhynchosia vendae C.H.Stirt. endemic
 Rhynchosia venulosa (Hiern) K.Schum. accepted as Rhynchosia totta (Thunb.) DC. var. venulosa (Hiern) Verdc. indigenous
 Rhynchosia villosa (Meisn.) Druce, endemic
 Rhynchosia viscidula Steud. endemic
 Rhynchosia woodii Schinz, indigenous

Robinia
Genus Robinia:
 Robinia pseudoacacia L. not indigenous, naturalised, invasive

Rothia
Genus Rothia:
 Rothia hirsuta (Guill. & Perr.) Baker, indigenous

Schotia
Genus Schotia:
 Schotia afra (L.) Thunb. indigenous
 Schotia afra (L.) Thunb. var. afra,   endemic
 Schotia afra (L.) Thunb. var. angustifolia (E.Mey.) Harv. indigenous
 Schotia brachypetala Sond. indigenous
 Schotia capitata Bolle, indigenous
 Schotia latifolia Jacq. indigenous

Senegalia
Genus Senegalia:
 Senegalia ataxacantha (DC.) Kyal. & Boatwr. indigenous
 Senegalia brevispica (Harms) Seigler & Ebinger subsp. dregeana (Benth.) Kyal. & Boatwr. indigenous
 Senegalia burkei (Benth.) Kyal. & Boatwr. indigenous
 Senegalia caffra (Thunb.) P.J.H.Hurter & Mabb. indigenous
 Senegalia cinerea (Schinz) Kyal. & Boatwr. indigenous
 Senegalia circummarginata (Chiov.) Kyal. & Boatwr. indigenous
 Senegalia erubescens (Welw. ex Oliv.) Kyal. & Boatwr. indigenous
 Senegalia galpinii (Burtt Davy) Seigler & Ebinger, indigenous
 Senegalia hereroensis (Engl.) Kyal. & Boatwr. indigenous
 Senegalia kraussiana (Meisn. ex Benth.) Kyal. & Boatwr. indigenous
 Senegalia mellifera (Vahl) Seigler & Ebinger, indigenous
 Senegalia mellifera (Vahl) Seigler & Ebinger subsp. detinens (Burch.) Kyal. & Boatwr. indigenous
 Senegalia mellifera (Vahl) Seigler & Ebinger subsp. mellifera, indigenous
 Senegalia montis-salinarum N.Hahn, endemic
 Senegalia nigrescens (Oliv.) P.J.H.Hurter, indigenous
 Senegalia polyacantha (Willd.) Seigler & Ebinger, indigenous
 Senegalia polyacantha (Willd.) Seigler & Ebinger subsp. campylacantha (Hochst. ex A.Rich.) Kyal. & B, indigenous
 Senegalia schweinfurthii (Brenan & Exell) Seigler & Ebinger, indigenous
 Senegalia schweinfurthii (Brenan & Exell) Seigler & Ebinger var. schweinfurthii, indigenous
 Senegalia senegal (L.) Britton, indigenous
 Senegalia senegal (L.) Britton var. leiorhachis (Brenan) Kyal. & Boatwr. indigenous
 Senegalia senegal (L.) Britton var. rostrata (Brenan) Kyal. & Boatwr. indigenous
 Senegalia welwitschii (Oliv.) Kyal. & Boatwr. indigenous
 Senegalia welwitschii (Oliv.) Kyal. & Boatwr. subsp. delagoensis (Harms ex Burtt Davy) Kyal. & Boatw, indigenous

Senna
Genus Senna:
 Senna bicapsularis (L.) Roxb. not indigenous, naturalised, invasive
 Senna corymbosa (Lam.) H.S.Irwin & Barneby, not indigenous, naturalised
 Senna didymobotrya (Fresen.) H.S.Irwin & Barneby, not indigenous, cultivated, naturalised, invasive
 Senna hirsuta (L.) H.S.Irwin & Barneby, not indigenous, naturalised, invasive
 Senna italica Mill. indigenous
 Senna italica Mill. subsp. arachoides (Burch.) Lock, indigenous
 Senna multiglandulosa (Jacq.) H.S.Irwin & Barneby, not indigenous, naturalised
 Senna obtusifolia (L.) H.S.Irwin & Barneby, not indigenous, naturalised
 Senna occidentalis (L.) Link, not indigenous, naturalised, invasive
 Senna pendula (Willd.) H.S.Irwin & Barneby, not indigenous, naturalised
 Senna pendula (Willd.) H.S.Irwin & Barneby var. glabrata (Vogel) H.S.Irwin & Barneby, not indigenous, naturalised, invasive
 Senna petersiana (Bolle) Lock, indigenous
 Senna septemtrionalis (Viv.) H.S.Irwin & Barneby, not indigenous, naturalised, invasive
 Senna siamea (Lam.) H.S.Irwin & Barneby, not indigenous, naturalised
 Senna spectabilis (DC.) H.S.Irwin & Barneby, not indigenous, cultivated, naturalised, invasive

Sesbania
Genus Sesbania:
 Sesbania bispinosa (Jacq.) W.Wight var. bispinosa,   not indigenous, naturalised
 Sesbania brevipedunculata J.B.Gillett, indigenous
 Sesbania macowaniana Schinz, indigenous
 Sesbania macrantha Welw. ex E.Phillips & Hutch. indigenous
 Sesbania macrantha Welw. ex E.Phillips & Hutch. var. levis J.B.Gillett, indigenous
 Sesbania macrantha Welw. ex E.Phillips & Hutch. var. macrantha,   indigenous
 Sesbania marginata Benth. accepted as Sesbania virgata (Cav.) Pers. present
 Sesbania notialis J.B.Gillett, endemic
 Sesbania punicea (Cav.) Benth. not indigenous, naturalised, invasive
 Sesbania rogersii E.Phillips & Hutch. indigenous
 Sesbania sesban (L.) Merr. indigenous
 Sesbania sesban (L.) Merr. subsp. sesban,   indigenous
 Sesbania sesban (L.) Merr. subsp. sesban var. nubica,   indigenous
 Sesbania sesban (L.) Merr. subsp. sesban var. sesban,   indigenous
 Sesbania sesban (L.) Merr. subsp. sesban var. zambesiaca,   indigenous
 Sesbania tetraptera Hochst. ex Baker, indigenous
 Sesbania tetraptera Hochst. ex Baker subsp. tetraptera,   indigenous
 Sesbania transvaalensis J.B.Gillett, indigenous
 Sesbania tripetii (Poit.) Hort. ex F.T.Hubb. accepted as Sesbania punicea (Cav.) Benth. not indigenous, naturalised
 Sesbania virgata (Cav.) Pers. not indigenous, naturalised

Smithia
Genus Smithia:
 Smithia erubescens (E.Mey.) Baker f. indigenous

Sophora
Genus Sophora:
 Sophora inhambanensis Klotzsch, indigenous
 Sophora japonica L. accepted as Styphnolobium japonicum (L.) Schott, not indigenous, naturalised

Spartium
Genus Spartium:
 Spartium junceum L. not indigenous, cultivated, naturalised, invasive

Sphenostylis
Genus Sphenostylis:
 Sphenostylis angustifolia Sond. indigenous
 Sphenostylis marginata E.Mey. indigenous
 Sphenostylis marginata E.Mey. subsp. marginata,   indigenous

Stirtonanthus
Genus Stirtonanthus:
 Stirtonanthus chrysanthus (Adamson) B.-E.van Wyk & A.L.Schutte, endemic
 Stirtonanthus insignis (Compton) B.-E.van Wyk & A.L.Schutte, endemic
 Stirtonanthus taylorianus (L.Bolus) B.-E.van Wyk & A.L.Schutte, endemic

Stirtonia
Genus Stirtonia:
 Stirtonia chrysantha (Adamson) B.-E.van Wyk & A.L.Schutte, accepted as Stirtonanthus chrysanthus (Adamson) B.-E.van Wyk & A.L.Schutte, present
 Stirtonia insignis (Compton) B.-E.van Wyk & A.L.Schutte, accepted as Stirtonanthus insignis (Compton) B.-E.van Wyk & A.L.Schutte, present
 Stirtonia tayloriana (L.Bolus) B.-E.van Wyk & A.L.Schutte, accepted as Stirtonanthus taylorianus (L.Bolus) B.-E.van Wyk & A.L.Schutte, present

Stylosanthes
Genus Stylosanthes:
 Stylosanthes fruticosa (Retz.) Alston, indigenous

Styphnolobium
Genus Styphnolobium:
 Styphnolobium japonicum (L.) Schott, not indigenous, cultivated, naturalised, invasive

Sutherlandia
Genus Sutherlandia:
 Sutherlandia frutescens (L.) R.Br. accepted as Lessertia frutescens (L.) Goldblatt & J.C.Manning subsp. frutescens, indigenous
 Sutherlandia humilis E.Phillips & R.A.Dyer, accepted as Lessertia frutescens (L.) Goldblatt & J.C.Manning subsp. frutescens, endemic
 Sutherlandia microphylla Burch. ex DC. accepted as Lessertia frutescens (L.) Goldblatt & J.C.Manning subsp. microphylla (Burch. ex DC.) J.C.Manning & B, indigenous
 Sutherlandia montana E.Phillips & R.A.Dyer, accepted as Lessertia frutescens (L.) Goldblatt & J.C.Manning subsp. frutescens, indigenous
 Sutherlandia speciosa E.Phillips & R.A.Dyer, accepted as Lessertia frutescens (L.) Goldblatt & J.C.Manning subsp. speciosa (E.Phillips & R.A.Dyer) J.C.Mannin, endemic
 Sutherlandia tomentosa Eckl. & Zeyh. accepted as Lessertia canescens Goldblatt & J.C.Manning, present

Swartzia
Genus Swartzia:
 Swartzia madagascariensis Desv. accepted as Bobgunnia madagascariensis (Desv.) J.H.Kirkbr. & Wiersema

Tamarindus
Genus Tamarindus:
 Tamarindus indica L. not indigenous, naturalised

Tephrosia
Genus Tephrosia:
 Tephrosia acaciifolia Baker, indigenous
 Tephrosia aequalata Baker, indigenous
 Tephrosia aequalata Baker subsp. australis Brummitt, indigenous
 Tephrosia albissima H.M.L.Forbes, indigenous
 Tephrosia albissima H.M.L.Forbes subsp. albissima,   indigenous
 Tephrosia albissima H.M.L.Forbes subsp. zuluensis (H.M.L.Forbes) Schrire, endemic
 Tephrosia bachmannii Harms, endemic
 Tephrosia brummittii Schrire, indigenous
 Tephrosia burchellii Burtt Davy, indigenous
 Tephrosia capensis (Jacq.) Pers. indigenous
 Tephrosia capensis (Jacq.) Pers. var. acutifolia E.Mey. endemic
 Tephrosia capensis (Jacq.) Pers. var. angustifolia E.Mey. endemic
 Tephrosia capensis (Jacq.) Pers. var. capensis,   indigenous
 Tephrosia capensis (Jacq.) Pers. var. hirsuta Harv. indigenous
 Tephrosia capensis (Jacq.) Pers. var. longipetiolata H.M.L.Forbes, endemic
 Tephrosia cordata Hutch. & Burtt Davy, indigenous
 Tephrosia dregeana E.Mey. indigenous
 Tephrosia dregeana E.Mey. var. dregeana,   indigenous
 Tephrosia elongata E.Mey. indigenous
 Tephrosia elongata E.Mey. var. elongata,   indigenous
 Tephrosia elongata E.Mey. var. lasiocaulos Brummitt, indigenous
 Tephrosia elongata E.Mey. var. tzaneenensis (H.M.L.Forbes) Brummitt, indigenous
 Tephrosia euchroa I.Verd. endemic
 Tephrosia forbesii Baker, indigenous
 Tephrosia forbesii Baker subsp. interior Brummitt, indigenous
 Tephrosia galpinii H.M.L.Forbes, accepted as Tephrosia albissima H.M.L.Forbes subsp. albissima,   endemic
 Tephrosia glomeruliflora Meisn. indigenous
 Tephrosia glomeruliflora Meisn. subsp. glomeruliflora,   endemic
 Tephrosia glomeruliflora Meisn. subsp. meisneri (Hutch. & Burtt Davy) Schrire, indigenous
 Tephrosia gracilenta H.M.L.Forbes, endemic
 Tephrosia grandiflora (Aiton) Pers. endemic
 Tephrosia inandensis H.M.L.Forbes, endemic
 Tephrosia kraussiana Meisn. indigenous
 Tephrosia limpopoensis J.B.Gillett, indigenous
 Tephrosia linearis (Willd.) Pers. indigenous
 Tephrosia longipes Meisn. indigenous
 Tephrosia longipes Meisn. subsp. longipes var. icosisperma,   accepted as Tephrosia longipes Meisn. subsp. longipes var. longipes,   present
 Tephrosia longipes Meisn. subsp. longipes var. uncinata,   accepted as Tephrosia longipes Meisn. present
 Tephrosia lupinifolia DC. indigenous
 Tephrosia macropoda (E.Mey.) Harv. indigenous
 Tephrosia macropoda (E.Mey.) Harv. var. diffusa (E.Mey.) Schrire, indigenous
 Tephrosia macropoda (E.Mey.) Harv. var. macropoda,   indigenous
 Tephrosia marginella H.M.L.Forbes, endemic
 Tephrosia multijuga R.G.N.Young, indigenous
 Tephrosia natalensis H.M.L.Forbes, indigenous
 Tephrosia natalensis H.M.L.Forbes subsp. natalensis,   indigenous
 Tephrosia natalensis H.M.L.Forbes subsp. pseudocapitata (H.M.L.Forbes) Schrire, endemic
 Tephrosia noctiflora Bojer ex Baker, indigenous
 Tephrosia pietersii H.M.L.Forbes, endemic
 Tephrosia polystachya E.Mey. indigenous
 Tephrosia polystachya E.Mey. var. hirta Harv. indigenous
 Tephrosia polystachya E.Mey. var. latifolia Harv. indigenous
 Tephrosia polystachya E.Mey. var. longidens H.M.L.Forbes, endemic
 Tephrosia polystachya E.Mey. var. polystachya,   indigenous
 Tephrosia pondoensis (Codd) Schrire, endemic
 Tephrosia pumila (Lam.) Pers. indigenous
 Tephrosia pumila (Lam.) Pers. var. pumila,   indigenous
 Tephrosia purpurea (L.) Pers. indigenous
 Tephrosia purpurea (L.) Pers. subsp. canescens (E.Mey.) Brummitt, indigenous
 Tephrosia purpurea (L.) Pers. subsp. leptostachya (DC.) Brummitt, indigenous
 Tephrosia purpurea (L.) Pers. subsp. leptostachya (DC.) Brummitt var. delagoensis,   indigenous
 Tephrosia purpurea (L.) Pers. subsp. leptostachya (DC.) Brummitt var. leptostachya,   indigenous
 Tephrosia purpurea (L.) Pers. subsp. leptostachya (DC.) Brummitt var. pubescens,   indigenous
 Tephrosia purpurea (L.) Pers. subsp. purpurea,   not indigenous, naturalised
 Tephrosia radicans Baker, indigenous
 Tephrosia reptans Baker, indigenous
 Tephrosia reptans Baker var. reptans,   indigenous
 Tephrosia retusa Burtt Davy, indigenous
 Tephrosia rhodesica Baker f. indigenous
 Tephrosia rhodesica Baker f. var. evansii (Hutch. & Burtt Davy) Brummitt, indigenous
 Tephrosia rhodesica Baker f. var. rhodesica,   indigenous
 Tephrosia semiglabra Sond. indigenous
 Tephrosia shiluwanensis Schinz, indigenous
 Tephrosia subulata Hutch. & Burtt Davy, endemic
 Tephrosia uniflora Pers. indigenous
 Tephrosia uniflora Pers. subsp. uniflora, indigenous
 Tephrosia villosa (L.) Pers. indigenous
 Tephrosia villosa (L.) Pers. subsp. ehrenbergiana (Schweinf.) Brummitt, indigenous
 Tephrosia villosa (L.) Pers. subsp. ehrenbergiana (Schweinf.) Brummitt var. daviesii, indigenous
 Tephrosia villosa (L.) Pers. subsp. ehrenbergiana (Schweinf.) Brummitt var. ehrenbergiana, indigenous
 Tephrosia virgata H.M.L.Forbes, endemic
 Tephrosia vogelii Hook.f. indigenous
 Tephrosia zoutpansbergensis Bremek. indigenous

Teramnus
Genus Teramnus:
 Teramnus labialis (L.f.) Spreng. subsp. labialis, indigenous
 Teramnus labialis (L.f.) Spreng. subsp. labialis var. acutus, indigenous

Tipuana
Genus Tipuana:
 Tipuana tipu (Benth.) Kuntze, not indigenous, naturalised, invasive

Trifolium
Genus Trifolium:
 Trifolium africanum Ser. indigenous
 Trifolium africanum Ser. var. africanum, indigenous
 Trifolium africanum Ser. var. lydenburgense J.B.Gillett, indigenous
 Trifolium angustifolium L. var. angustifolium,   not indigenous, naturalised
 Trifolium arvense L. var. arvense, not indigenous, naturalised
 Trifolium burchellianum Ser. indigenous
 Trifolium burchellianum Ser. subsp. burchellianum, indigenous
 Trifolium burchellianum Ser. subsp. johnstonii (Oliv.) Cufod. ex J.B.Gillett, indigenous
 Trifolium campestre Schreb. var. campestre, not indigenous, naturalised
 Trifolium cernuum Brot. not indigenous, naturalised
 Trifolium clusii Godr. & Gren. not indigenous, naturalised, invasive
 Trifolium diffusum Thunb., accepted as Leobordea rosea (Dummer) L.A.Silva & J.Freitas, indigenous
 Trifolium dubium Sibth. not indigenous, naturalised
 Trifolium glomeratum L. not indigenous, naturalised
 Trifolium hirtum All. not indigenous, naturalised, invasive
 Trifolium hybridum L. var. hybridum, not indigenous, naturalised
 Trifolium incarnatum L. var. incarnatum, not indigenous, naturalised
 Trifolium lanatum Thunb. accepted as Leobordea lanata (Thunb.) B.-E.van Wyk & Boatwr. indigenous
 Trifolium medium L. var. medium, not indigenous, naturalised
 Trifolium pratense L. var. pratense, not indigenous, naturalised
 Trifolium repens L., not indigenous, naturalised
 Trifolium resupinatum L. var. resupinatum, not indigenous, naturalised
 Trifolium stipulaceum Thunb. endemic
 Trifolium subterraneum L. var. subterraneum, not indigenous, naturalised
 Trifolium suffocatum L. not indigenous, naturalised
 Trifolium tomentosum L. var. tomentosum, not indigenous, naturalised

Trigonella
Genus Trigonella:
 Trigonella anguina Delile, indigenous
 Trigonella foenum-graecum L. not indigenous, naturalised
 Trigonella hamosa L. not indigenous, naturalised

Tylosema
Genus Tylosema:
 Tylosema esculentum (Burch.) A.Schreib. indigenous
 Tylosema fassoglense (Schweinf.) Torre & Hillc. indigenous

Ulex
Genus Ulex:
 Ulex europaeus L. not indigenous, naturalised, invasive

Umtiza
Genus Umtiza:
 Umtiza listeriana Sim, endemic

Vachellia
Genus Vachellia:
 Vachellia borleae (Burtt Davy) Kyal. & Boatwr. indigenous
 Vachellia davyi (N.E.Br.) Kyal. & Boatwr. indigenous
 Vachellia dyeri (P.P.Sw.) Kyal. & Boatwr. endemic
 Vachellia ebutsiniorum (P.J.H.Hurter) Kyal. & Boatwr. endemic
 Vachellia erioloba (E.Mey.) P.J.H.Hurter, indigenous
 Vachellia exuvialis (I.Verd.) Kyal. & Boatwr. indigenous
 Vachellia farnesiana (L.) Wight & Arn. not indigenous, naturalised
 Vachellia gerrardii (Benth.) P.J.H.Hurter, indigenous
 Vachellia gerrardii (Benth.) P.J.H.Hurter subsp. gerrardii var. gerrardii, indigenous
 Vachellia grandicornuta (Gerstner) Seigler & Ebinger, indigenous
 Vachellia haematoxylon (Willd.) Seigler & Ebinger, indigenous
 Vachellia hebeclada (DC.) Kyal. & Boatwr. indigenous
 Vachellia hebeclada (DC.) Kyal. & Boatwr. subsp. hebeclada, indigenous
 Vachellia karroo (Hayne) Banfi & Gallaso, indigenous
 Vachellia kosiensis (P.P.Sw. & Coates Palgr.) Kyal. & Boatwr. endemic
 Vachellia luederitzii (Engl.) Kyal. & Boatwr. indigenous
 Vachellia luederitzii (Engl.) Kyal. & Boatwr. var. luederitzii, indigenous
 Vachellia luederitzii (Engl.) Kyal. & Boatwr. var. retinens (Sim) & Kyal. & Boatwr. indigenous
 Vachellia montana (P.P.Sw.) Kyal. & Boatwr. indigenous
 Vachellia natalitia (E.Mey.) Kyal. & Boatwr. endemic
 Vachellia nebrownii (Burtt Davy) Seigler & Ebinger, indigenous
 Vachellia nilotica (L.) P.J.H.Hurter & Mabb. indigenous
 Vachellia nilotica (L.) P.J.H.Hurter & Mabb. subsp. kraussiana (Benth.) Kyal. & Boatwr. indigenous
 Vachellia permixta (Burtt Davy) Kyal. & Boatwr. indigenous
 Vachellia rehmanniana (Schinz) Kyal. & Boatwr. indigenous
 Vachellia robbertsei (P.P.Sw.) Kyal. & Boatwr. endemic
 Vachellia robusta (Burch.) Kyal. & Boatwr. indigenous
 Vachellia robusta (Burch.) Kyal. & Boatwr. subsp. clavigera (E.Mey.) & Kyal. & Boatwr. indigenous
 Vachellia robusta (Burch.) Kyal. & Boatwr. subsp. robusta,   indigenous
 Vachellia sekhukhuniensis (P.J.H.Hurter) Kyal. & Boatwr. endemic
 Vachellia sieberiana (DC.) Kyal. & Boatwr. indigenous
 Vachellia sieberiana (DC.) Kyal. & Boatwr. var. woodii (Burtt Davy) Kyal. & Boatwr. indigenous
 Vachellia stuhlmannii (Taub.) Kyal. & Boatwr. indigenous
 Vachellia swazica (Burtt Davy) Kyal. & Boatwr. indigenous
 Vachellia tenuispina (I.Verd.) Kyal. & Boatwr. indigenous
 Vachellia tortilis (Forssk.) Gallaso & Banfi, indigenous
 Vachellia tortilis (Forssk.) Gallaso & Banfi subsp. heteracantha (Burch.) Kyal. & Boatwr. indigenous
 Vachellia xanthophloea (Benth.) P.J.H.Hurter, indigenous

Vicia
Genus Vicia:
 Vicia angustifolia L. accepted as Vicia sativa L. subsp. nigra (L.) Ehrh. present
 Vicia benghalensis L. not indigenous, naturalised
 Vicia cracca L. not indigenous, naturalised
 Vicia eriocarpa (Hausskn.) Halacsy, not indigenous, naturalised, invasive
 Vicia hirsuta (L.) Gray, not indigenous, naturalised
 Vicia sativa L. not indigenous, naturalised
 Vicia sativa L. subsp. nigra (L.) Ehrh. not indigenous, naturalised
 Vicia sativa L. subsp. sativa, not indigenous, naturalised
 Vicia tetrasperma Moench, not indigenous, naturalised
 Vicia villosa Roth, not indigenous, naturalised
 Vicia villosa Roth subsp. villosa, not indigenous, naturalised

Vigna
Genus Vigna:
 Vigna comosa Baker subsp. comosa, not indigenous, naturalised
 Vigna friesiorum Harms, indigenous
 Vigna friesiorum Harms var. friesiorum, indigenous
 Vigna frutescens A.Rich. subsp. frutescens var. frutescens, indigenous
 Vigna junodii Harms, accepted as Nesphostylis junodii (Harms) Munyeny. & F.A.Bisby, indigenous
 Vigna kokii B.J.Pienaar, indigenous
 Vigna lobatifolia Baker, accepted as Vigna vexillata (L.) A.Rich. var. lobatifolia (Baker) Pasquet
 Vigna luteola (Jacq.) Benth. indigenous
 Vigna luteola (Jacq.) Benth. var. luteola, indigenous
 Vigna marina (Burm.) Merr. indigenous
 Vigna mudenia B.J.Pienaar, endemic
 Vigna nervosa Markotter, accepted as Vigna schlechteri Harms, indigenous
 Vigna oblongifolia A.Rich. indigenous
 Vigna oblongifolia A.Rich. var. oblongifolia, indigenous
 Vigna oblongifolia A.Rich. var. parviflora (Baker) Verdc. indigenous
 Vigna scabrida Burtt Davy, accepted as Vigna unguiculata (L.) Walp. subsp. unguiculata var. spontanea,   present
 Vigna schlechteri Harms, indigenous
 Vigna unguiculata (L.) Walp. indigenous
 Vigna unguiculata (L.) Walp. subsp. dekindtiana (Harms) Verdc. indigenous
 Vigna unguiculata (L.) Walp. subsp. dekindtiana (Harms) Verdc. var. dekindtiana, indigenous
 Vigna unguiculata (L.) Walp. subsp. dekindtiana (Harms) Verdc. var. huillensis, indigenous
 Vigna unguiculata (L.) Walp. subsp. protracta (E.Mey.) B.J.Pienaar, indigenous
 Vigna unguiculata (L.) Walp. subsp. stenophylla (Harv.) Marechal, Mascherpa & Stainier, indigenous
 Vigna unguiculata (L.) Walp. subsp. tenuis (E.Mey.) Marechal, Mascherpa & Stainier, indigenous
 Vigna unguiculata (L.) Walp. subsp. tenuis (E.Mey.) Marechal, Mascherpa & Stainier var. ovata, endemic
 Vigna unguiculata (L.) Walp. subsp. tenuis (E.Mey.) Marechal, Mascherpa & Stainier var. tenuis, indigenous
 Vigna unguiculata (L.) Walp. subsp. unguiculata,   indigenous
 Vigna unguiculata (L.) Walp. subsp. unguiculata var. unguiculata, indigenous
 Vigna vexillata (L.) A.Rich. indigenous
 Vigna vexillata (L.) A.Rich. var. angustifolia (Schumach. & Thonn.) Baker, indigenous
 Vigna vexillata (L.) A.Rich. var. davyi (Bolus) B.J.Pienaar, indigenous
 Vigna vexillata (L.) A.Rich. var. ovata (E.Mey.) B.J.Pienaar, indigenous
 Vigna vexillata (L.) A.Rich. var. vexillata, indigenous

Virgilia
Genus Virgilia:
 Virgilia divaricata Adamson, endemic
 Virgilia oroboides (P.J.Bergius) T.M.Salter, indigenous
 Virgilia oroboides (P.J.Bergius) T.M.Salter subsp. ferruginea B.-E.van Wyk, endemic
 Virgilia oroboides (P.J.Bergius) T.M.Salter subsp. oroboides, endemic

Wiborgia
Genus Wiborgia:
 Wiborgia fusca Thunb. indigenous
 Wiborgia fusca Thunb. subsp. fusca, endemic
 Wiborgia fusca Thunb. subsp. macrocarpa R.Dahlgren, endemic
 Wiborgia humilis (Thunb.) R.Dahlgren, accepted as Wiborgiella humilis (Thunb.) Boatwr. & B.-E.van Wyk, endemic
 Wiborgia incurvata E.Mey. endemic
 Wiborgia leptoptera R.Dahlgren, indigenous
 Wiborgia leptoptera R.Dahlgren subsp. cedarbergensis R.Dahlgren, endemic
 Wiborgia leptoptera R.Dahlgren subsp. leptoptera, endemic
 Wiborgia monoptera E.Mey. endemic
 Wiborgia mucronata (L.f.) Druce, endemic
 Wiborgia obcordata (P.J.Bergius) Thunb. endemic
 Wiborgia sericea Thunb. endemic
 Wiborgia tenuifolia E.Mey. endemic
 Wiborgia tetraptera E.Mey. endemic

Wiborgiella
Genus Wiborgiella:
 Wiborgiella bowieana (Benth.) Boatwr. & B.-E.van Wyk, endemic
 Wiborgiella dahlgrenii Boatwr. & B.-E.van Wyk, endemic
 Wiborgiella fasciculata (Benth.) Boatwr. & B.-E.van Wyk, endemic
 Wiborgiella humilis (Thunb.) Boatwr. & B.-E.van Wyk, endemic
 Wiborgiella inflata (Bolus) Boatwr. & B.-E.van Wyk, endemic
 Wiborgiella leipoldtiana (Schltr. ex R.Dahlgren) Boatwr. & B.-E.van Wyk, endemic
 Wiborgiella mucronata (Benth.) Boatwr. & B.-E.van Wyk, endemic
 Wiborgiella sessilifolia (Eckl. & Zeyh.) Boatwr. & B.-E.van Wyk, endemic
 Wiborgiella vlokii Boatwr. & B.-E.van Wyk, indigenous

Xanthocercis
Genus Xanthocercis:
 Xanthocercis zambesiaca (Baker) Dumaz-le-Grand, indigenous

Xerocladia
Genus Xerocladia:
 Xerocladia viridiramis (Burch.) Taub. indigenous

Xeroderris
Genus Xeroderris:
 Xeroderris stuhlmannii (Taub.) MendonÃ§a & E.C.Sousa, indigenous

Xiphotheca
Genus Xiphotheca:
 Xiphotheca canescens (Thunb.) A.L.Schutte & B.-E.van Wyk, endemic
 Xiphotheca cordifolia A.L.Schutte & B.-E.van Wyk, endemic
 Xiphotheca elliptica (DC.) A.L.Schutte & B.-E.van Wyk, endemic
 Xiphotheca fruticosa (L.) A.L.Schutte & B.-E.van Wyk, endemic
 Xiphotheca guthriei (L.Bolus) A.L.Schutte & B.-E.van Wyk, endemic
 Xiphotheca lanceolata (E.Mey.) Eckl. & Zeyh. endemic
 Xiphotheca phylicoides A.L.Schutte & B.-E.van Wyk, endemic
 Xiphotheca reflexa (Thunb.) A.L.Schutte & B.-E.van Wyk, endemic
 Xiphotheca rosmarinifolia A.L.Schutte, indigenous
 Xiphotheca tecta (Thunb.) A.L.Schutte & B.-E.van Wyk, endemic

Xylia
Genus Xylia:
 Xylia torreana Brenan, indigenous

Zornia
Genus Zornia:
 Zornia capensis Pers. indigenous
 Zornia capensis Pers. subsp. capensis, indigenous
 Zornia glochidiata Rchb. ex DC. indigenous
 Zornia linearis E.Mey. indigenous
 Zornia milneana Mohlenbr. indigenous

Polygalaceae
Family: Polygalaceae,

Heterosamara
Genus Heterosamara:
 Heterosamara galpinii (Hook.f.) Paiva, indigenous

Muraltia
Genus Muraltia:
 Muraltia acerosa Harv. endemic
 Muraltia acicularis Harv. endemic
 Muraltia acipetala Harv. endemic
 Muraltia aciphylla Levyns, endemic
 Muraltia alba Levyns, endemic
 Muraltia alopecuroides (L.) DC. endemic
 Muraltia alticola Schltr. indigenous
 Muraltia angulosa Turcz. endemic
 Muraltia angustiflora Levyns, endemic
 Muraltia arachnoidea Chodat, endemic
 Muraltia aspalatha DC. endemic
 Muraltia aspalathoides Schltr. endemic
 Muraltia asparagifolia Eckl. & Zeyh. endemic
 Muraltia barkerae Levyns, endemic
 Muraltia bolusii Levyns, endemic
 Muraltia bondii Vlok, endemic
 Muraltia brachyceras Schltr. endemic
 Muraltia brachypetala Wolley-Dod, endemic
 Muraltia brevicornu DC. endemic
 Muraltia caledonensis Levyns, endemic
 Muraltia calycina Harv. endemic
 Muraltia capensis Levyns, endemic
 Muraltia carnosa E.Mey. ex Harv. endemic
 Muraltia chamaepitys Chodat, endemic
 Muraltia ciliaris DC. endemic
 Muraltia cliffortiifolia Eckl. & Zeyh. endemic
 Muraltia collina Levyns, endemic
 Muraltia commutata Levyns, endemic
 Muraltia comptonii Levyns, endemic
 Muraltia concava Levyns, endemic
 Muraltia crassifolia Harv. endemic
 Muraltia curvipetala Levyns, endemic
 Muraltia cuspifolia Chodat, endemic
 Muraltia cyclolopha Chodat, endemic
 Muraltia decipiens Schltr. endemic
 Muraltia demissa Wolley-Dod, endemic
 Muraltia depressa DC. endemic
 Muraltia diabolica Levyns, endemic
 Muraltia dispersa Levyns, endemic
 Muraltia divaricata Eckl. & Zeyh. endemic
 Muraltia dumosa (Poir.) DC. endemic
 Muraltia elsieae Paiva, endemic
 Muraltia empetroides Chodat, indigenous
 Muraltia empleuridioides Schltr. indigenous
 Muraltia empleuridioides Schltr. var. diversifolia Levyns, endemic
 Muraltia empleuridioides Schltr. var. empleuridioides,  endemic
 Muraltia ericaefolia DC. endemic
 Muraltia ericoides (Burm.f.) Steud. endemic
 Muraltia ferox Levyns, endemic
 Muraltia filiformis (Thunb.) DC. indigenous
 Muraltia filiformis (Thunb.) DC. var. caledonensis Levyns, endemic
 Muraltia filiformis (Thunb.) DC. var. filiformis,  endemic
 Muraltia flanaganii Bolus, indigenous
 Muraltia gillettiae Levyns, endemic
 Muraltia guthriei Levyns, endemic
 Muraltia harveyana Levyns, endemic
 Muraltia heisteria (L.) DC. endemic
 Muraltia hirsuta Levyns, endemic
 Muraltia horrida Diels, endemic
 Muraltia hyssopifolia Chodat, endemic
 Muraltia juniperifolia (Poir.) DC. endemic
 Muraltia karroica Levyns, endemic
 Muraltia knysnaensis Levyns, endemic
 Muraltia lancifolia Harv. endemic
 Muraltia langebergensis Levyns, endemic
 Muraltia leptorhiza Turcz. endemic
 Muraltia lewisiae Levyns, endemic
 Muraltia lignosa Levyns, endemic
 Muraltia longicuspis Turcz. endemic
 Muraltia macowanii Levyns, endemic
 Muraltia macrocarpa Eckl. & Zeyh. indigenous
 Muraltia macroceras DC. endemic
 Muraltia macropetala Harv. endemic
 Muraltia minuta Levyns, endemic
 Muraltia mitior (P.J.Bergius) Levyns, endemic
 Muraltia mixta (L.f.) DC. endemic
 Muraltia montana Levyns, endemic
 Muraltia muirii F.Bolus, endemic
 Muraltia muraltioides (Eckl. & Zeyh.) Levyns, endemic
 Muraltia mutabilis Levyns, endemic
 Muraltia namaquensis Levyns, endemic
 Muraltia obovata DC. endemic
 Muraltia occidentalis Levyns, endemic
 Muraltia ononidifolia Eckl. & Zeyh. endemic
 Muraltia orbicularis Hutch. endemic
 Muraltia origanoides C.Presl, endemic
 Muraltia oxysepala Schltr. endemic
 Muraltia pageae Levyns, endemic
 Muraltia paludosa Levyns, endemic
 Muraltia pappeana Harv. endemic
 Muraltia parvifolia N.E.Br. endemic
 Muraltia pauciflora (Thunb.) DC. endemic
 Muraltia pillansii Levyns, endemic
 Muraltia plumosa Chodat, endemic
 Muraltia polyphylla (DC.) Levyns, endemic
 Muraltia pottebergensis Levyns, endemic
 Muraltia pubescens DC. endemic
 Muraltia pungens Schltr. endemic
 Muraltia rara Levyns, endemic
 Muraltia rhamnoides Chodat, endemic
 Muraltia rigida E.Mey. ex Turcz. endemic
 Muraltia rosmarinifolia Levyns, endemic
 Muraltia rubeacea Eckl. & Zeyh. endemic
 Muraltia salsolacea Chodat, endemic
 Muraltia satureioides DC. indigenous
 Muraltia satureioides DC. var. floribunda Levyns, endemic
 Muraltia satureioides DC. var. salteri (Levyns) & Levyns, endemic
 Muraltia satureioides DC. var. satureioides,  endemic
 Muraltia saxicola Chodat, indigenous
 Muraltia schlechteri Levyns, endemic
 Muraltia scoparia (Eckl. & Zeyh.) Levyns, indigenous
 Muraltia serpylloides DC. endemic
 Muraltia serrata Levyns, endemic
 Muraltia spicata Bolus, endemic
 Muraltia spinosa (L.) F.Forest & J.C.Manning, endemic
 Muraltia splendens Levyns, endemic
 Muraltia splendens Levyns var. pallida Levyns, endemic
 Muraltia splendens Levyns var. splendens,  indigenous
 Muraltia squarrosa (L.f.) DC. endemic
 Muraltia stenophylla Levyns, endemic
 Muraltia stipulacea (Burm.f.) DC. endemic
 Muraltia stokoei Levyns, endemic
 Muraltia tenuifolia (Poir.) DC. endemic
 Muraltia thunbergii Eckl. & Zeyh. endemic
 Muraltia thymifolia (Thunb.) DC. endemic
 Muraltia trinervia (L.f.) DC. endemic
 Muraltia vulnerans Levyns, endemic
 Muraltia vulpina Chodat, endemic

Nylandtia
Genus Nylandtia:
 Nylandtia scoparia (Eckl. & Zeyh.) Goldblatt & J.C.Manning, accepted as Muraltia scoparia (Eckl. & Zeyh.) Levyns, endemic
 Nylandtia spinosa (L.) Dumort. accepted as Muraltia spinosa (L.) F.Forest & J.C.Manning, endemic
 Nylandtia spinosa (L.) Dumort. var. scoparia (Eckl. & Zeyh.) C.T.Johnson & Weitz, accepted as Muraltia scoparia (Eckl. & Zeyh.) Levyns, present

Polygala
Genus Polygala:
 Polygala affinis DC. accepted as Polygala scabra L. present
 Polygala africana Chodat, indigenous
 Polygala albida Schinz, indigenous
 Polygala albida Schinz subsp. albida,  indigenous
 Polygala amatymbica Eckl. & Zeyh. indigenous
 Polygala asbestina Burch. endemic
 Polygala bicornis (Burch.) Chodat, accepted as Polygala schinziana Chodat, present
 Polygala bowkerae Harv. endemic
 Polygala brachyphylla Chodat, endemic
 Polygala bracteolata L. endemic
 Polygala capillaris E.Mey. ex Harv. indigenous
 Polygala capillaris E.Mey. ex Harv. subsp. capillaris,  indigenous
 Polygala chloroptera Chodat, accepted as Polygala serpentaria Eckl. & Zeyh. present
 Polygala confusa MacOwan, accepted as Polygala macowaniana Paiva, present
 Polygala dasyphylla Levyns, endemic
 Polygala declinata (Harv.) E.Mey. ex Paiva, endemic
 Polygala ephedroides Burch. indigenous
 Polygala ericaefolia DC. endemic
 Polygala erioptera DC. indigenous
 Polygala erioptera DC. subsp. erioptera,  indigenous
 Polygala erioptera DC. subsp. petraea (Chodat) Paiva, indigenous
 Polygala erubescens E.Mey. ex Chodat, indigenous
 Polygala esterae Chodat, accepted as Polygala gazensis Baker f. present
 Polygala fallax Hayek, indigenous
 Polygala fruticosa P.J.Bergius, endemic
 Polygala galpinii Hook.f. accepted as Heterosamara galpinii (Hook.f.) Paiva, present
 Polygala garcinii DC. endemic
 Polygala gazensis Baker f. indigenous
 Polygala gerrardii Chodat, endemic
 Polygala gracilenta Burtt Davy, indigenous
 Polygala gracilipes Harv. endemic
 Polygala gymnoclada MacOwan, indigenous
 Polygala hispida Burch. ex DC. indigenous
 Polygala hottentotta C.Presl, indigenous
 Polygala houtboshiana Chodat, indigenous
 Polygala illepida E.Mey. ex Harv. endemic
 Polygala krumanina Burch. ex Ficalho & Hiern, endemic
 Polygala langebergensis Levyns, endemic
 Polygala lasiosepala Levyns, indigenous
 Polygala leendertziae Burtt Davy, indigenous
 Polygala lehmanniana Eckl. & Zeyh. endemic
 Polygala leptophylla Burch. indigenous
 Polygala leptophylla Burch. var. armata (Chodat) Paiva, indigenous
 Polygala leptophylla Burch. var. leptophylla,  indigenous
 Polygala levynsiana Paiva, endemic
 Polygala ludwigiana Eckl. & Zeyh. endemic
 Polygala lysimachiifolia Chodat, indigenous
 Polygala macowaniana Paiva, endemic
 Polygala marensis Burtt Davy, indigenous
 Polygala meridionalis Levyns, endemic
 Polygala microlopha DC. indigenous
 Polygala microlopha DC. var. gracilis Levyns, accepted as Polygala levynsiana Paiva, present
 Polygala microlopha DC. var. microlopha,  endemic
 Polygala mossii Exell, indigenous
 Polygala myrtifolia L. indigenous
 Polygala myrtifolia L. var. myrtifolia,  indigenous
 Polygala myrtifolia L. var. pinifolia (Lam. ex Poir.) Paiva, endemic
 Polygala natalensis Chodat, accepted as Polygala serpentaria Eckl. & Zeyh. present
 Polygala nematocaulis Levyns, endemic
 Polygala ohlendorfiana Eckl. & Zeyh. indigenous
 Polygala pappeana Eckl. & Zeyh. endemic
 Polygala parkeri Levyns, endemic
 Polygala peduncularis Burch. ex DC. endemic
 Polygala petitiana A.Rich. var. parviflora Exell, accepted as Polygala petitiana A.Rich. subsp. parviflora (Exell) Paiva 
 Polygala petraea Chodat, accepted as Polygala erioptera DC. subsp. petraea (Chodat) Paiva, present
 Polygala polyphylla DC. accepted as Muraltia polyphylla (DC.) Levyns, present
 Polygala pottebergensis Levyns, endemic
 Polygala praticola Chodat, endemic
 Polygala producta N.E.Br. indigenous
 Polygala pubiflora Burch. endemic
 Polygala pungens Burch. endemic
 Polygala recognita Chodat, endemic
 Polygala reflexa Schinz, accepted as Polygala kalaxariensis Schinz, present
 Polygala refracta DC. indigenous
 Polygala rehmannii Chodat, indigenous
 Polygala retiefianum Paiva & Figueiredo, indigenous
 Polygala rhinostigma Chodat, indigenous
 Polygala rigens Burch. endemic
 Polygala rodrigueana Paiva, endemic
 Polygala scabra L. indigenous
 Polygala schinziana Chodat, indigenous
 Polygala sekhukhuniensis Retief, Siebert & A.E.van Wyk, indigenous
 Polygala seminuda Harv. indigenous
 Polygala senensis Klotzsch, indigenous
 Polygala senensis Klotzsch var. senensis,  indigenous
 Polygala serpentaria Eckl. & Zeyh. indigenous
 Polygala sphenoptera Fresen. var. sphenoptera,  indigenous
 Polygala spicata Chodat, indigenous
 Polygala teretifolia L.f. indigenous
 Polygala transvaalensis Chodat, indigenous
 Polygala transvaalensis Chodat subsp. transvaalensis,  indigenous
 Polygala triquetra C.Presl, endemic
 Polygala umbellata L. endemic
 Polygala uncinata E.Mey. ex Meisn. indigenous
 Polygala virgata Thunb. indigenous
 Polygala virgata Thunb. var. decora (Sond.) Harv. indigenous
 Polygala virgata Thunb. var. speciosa (Sims) Harv. endemic
 Polygala virgata Thunb. var. virgata,  indigenous
 Polygala volkensii Gurke, accepted as Polygala petitiana A.Rich. subsp. petitiana,  present
 Polygala welwitschii Chodat, indigenous
 Polygala welwitschii Chodat subsp. pygmaea (Gurke) Paiva, indigenous
 Polygala wilmsii Chodat, indigenous
 Polygala wittebergensis Compton, endemic
 Polygala woodii Chodat, endemic

Securidaca
Genus Securidaca:
 Securidaca longepedunculata Fresen. indigenous
 Securidaca longepedunculata Fresen. var. longepedunculata,  indigenous
 Securidaca longepedunculata Fresen. var. parvifolia Oliv. indigenous

See also 

 Helena M. L. Forbes

References

South African plant biodiversity lists
Fabales